This is a partial list of unnumbered minor planets for principal provisional designations assigned during 1–15 September 2002. Since this period yielded a high number of provisional discoveries, it is further split into several standalone pages. , a total of 418 bodies remain unnumbered for this period. Objects for this year are listed on the following pages: A–B · C · D–F · G–K · L–O · P · Qi · Qii · Ri · Rii · S · Ti · Tii · U–V and W–Y. Also see previous and next year.

R 

|- id="2002 RG263" bgcolor=#E9E9E9
| 3 ||  || MBA-M || 19.9 || data-sort-value="0.31" | 310 m || multiple || 2002–2018 || 13 Jul 2018 || 28 || align=left | Disc.: NEATAlt.: 2006 RC25 || 
|- id="2002 RL263" bgcolor=#d6d6d6
| 0 ||  || MBA-O || 17.2 || 2.0 km || multiple || 2002–2021 || 07 Jan 2021 || 72 || align=left | Disc.: NEATAlt.: 2008 VG9 || 
|- id="2002 RP263" bgcolor=#fefefe
| 0 ||  || MBA-I || 17.41 || data-sort-value="0.98" | 980 m || multiple || 2002–2021 || 26 Nov 2021 || 203 || align=left | Disc.: NEATAlt.: 2017 OP37 || 
|- id="2002 RT263" bgcolor=#E9E9E9
| 0 ||  || MBA-M || 16.5 || 2.1 km || multiple || 2001–2021 || 07 Jan 2021 || 192 || align=left | Disc.: NEATAlt.: 2007 US135 || 
|- id="2002 RU263" bgcolor=#fefefe
| 2 ||  || MBA-I || 19.2 || data-sort-value="0.43" | 430 m || multiple || 2002–2021 || 18 Jan 2021 || 32 || align=left | Disc.: NEATAlt.: 2009 SZ106 || 
|- id="2002 RV263" bgcolor=#fefefe
| 0 ||  || MBA-I || 18.9 || data-sort-value="0.49" | 490 m || multiple || 2002–2018 || 14 Sep 2018 || 104 || align=left | Disc.: NEATAlt.: 2015 VE34 || 
|- id="2002 RB264" bgcolor=#E9E9E9
| 0 ||  || MBA-M || 17.3 || 1.5 km || multiple || 2002–2019 || 06 Sep 2019 || 89 || align=left | Disc.: NEATAlt.: 2011 SE190 || 
|- id="2002 RL264" bgcolor=#E9E9E9
| 0 ||  || MBA-M || 18.2 || data-sort-value="0.96" | 960 m || multiple || 2002–2015 || 03 Nov 2015 || 58 || align=left | Disc.: NEAT || 
|- id="2002 RM264" bgcolor=#FA8072
| 2 ||  || MCA || 19.0 || data-sort-value="0.47" | 470 m || multiple || 2002–2019 || 23 Sep 2019 || 36 || align=left | Disc.: NEAT || 
|- id="2002 RO264" bgcolor=#fefefe
| 1 ||  || MBA-I || 18.6 || data-sort-value="0.57" | 570 m || multiple || 2002–2020 || 19 Oct 2020 || 85 || align=left | Disc.: NEAT || 
|- id="2002 RP264" bgcolor=#E9E9E9
| 0 ||  || MBA-M || 17.55 || 1.7 km || multiple || 2002–2021 || 28 Nov 2021 || 120 || align=left | Disc.: NEATAlt.: 2016 NQ49 || 
|- id="2002 RR264" bgcolor=#E9E9E9
| 0 ||  || MBA-M || 17.6 || 1.3 km || multiple || 2002–2021 || 14 Jan 2021 || 94 || align=left | Disc.: NEATAlt.: 2015 PB2 || 
|- id="2002 RT264" bgcolor=#fefefe
| 0 ||  || MBA-I || 18.46 || data-sort-value="0.60" | 600 m || multiple || 2002–2021 || 01 Nov 2021 || 39 || align=left | Disc.: NEAT || 
|- id="2002 RU264" bgcolor=#E9E9E9
| – ||  || MBA-M || 17.4 || 1.4 km || single || 24 days || 05 Oct 2002 || 14 || align=left | Disc.: NEAT || 
|- id="2002 RA265" bgcolor=#d6d6d6
| E ||  || MBA-O || 17.3 || 1.9 km || single || 3 days || 16 Sep 2002 || 10 || align=left | Disc.: NEAT || 
|- id="2002 RB265" bgcolor=#fefefe
| 0 ||  || MBA-I || 18.84 || data-sort-value="0.51" | 510 m || multiple || 2002–2022 || 25 Jan 2022 || 83 || align=left | Disc.: SpacewatchAlt.: 2002 QU37 || 
|- id="2002 RC265" bgcolor=#d6d6d6
| 0 ||  || MBA-O || 16.2 || 3.2 km || multiple || 1995–2020 || 18 Apr 2020 || 118 || align=left | Disc.: NEAT || 
|- id="2002 RD265" bgcolor=#E9E9E9
| 4 ||  || MBA-M || 18.2 || data-sort-value="0.68" | 680 m || multiple || 2002–2014 || 02 Sep 2014 || 17 || align=left | Disc.: NEATAlt.: 2014 RT4 || 
|- id="2002 RE265" bgcolor=#fefefe
| 1 ||  || MBA-I || 18.4 || data-sort-value="0.62" | 620 m || multiple || 2002–2020 || 11 Sep 2020 || 28 || align=left | Disc.: NEATAlt.: 2020 OR99 || 
|- id="2002 RH265" bgcolor=#E9E9E9
| 1 ||  || MBA-M || 17.3 || 1.9 km || multiple || 2002-2022 || 17 Nov 2022 || 52 || align=left | Disc.: NEAT || 
|- id="2002 RL265" bgcolor=#fefefe
| E ||  || MBA-I || 19.4 || data-sort-value="0.39" | 390 m || single || 3 days || 16 Sep 2002 || 12 || align=left | Disc.: NEAT || 
|- id="2002 RM265" bgcolor=#E9E9E9
| 0 ||  || MBA-M || 18.4 || data-sort-value="0.88" | 880 m || multiple || 2002–2019 || 06 Sep 2019 || 41 || align=left | Disc.: NEATAlt.: 2015 TT253 || 
|- id="2002 RU265" bgcolor=#E9E9E9
| 0 ||  || MBA-M || 17.30 || 1.9 km || multiple || 2000–2021 || 09 Dec 2021 || 157 || align=left | Disc.: AMOSAlt.: 2015 LP16 || 
|- id="2002 RV265" bgcolor=#d6d6d6
| 0 ||  || HIL || 15.9 || 3.7 km || multiple || 2000–2019 || 23 Oct 2019 || 52 || align=left | Disc.: NEATAlt.: 2010 MP54 || 
|- id="2002 RW265" bgcolor=#E9E9E9
| 0 ||  || MBA-M || 18.2 || data-sort-value="0.96" | 960 m || multiple || 2002–2019 || 08 Jun 2019 || 49 || align=left | Disc.: NEATAlt.: 2015 PD160 || 
|- id="2002 RZ265" bgcolor=#FA8072
| 2 ||  || MCA || 19.0 || data-sort-value="0.67" | 670 m || multiple || 2002–2012 || 16 Feb 2012 || 21 || align=left | Disc.: NEAT || 
|- id="2002 RE266" bgcolor=#E9E9E9
| 0 ||  || MBA-M || 16.68 || 1.9 km || multiple || 2002–2021 || 18 Apr 2021 || 344 || align=left | Disc.: NEAT || 
|- id="2002 RM266" bgcolor=#fefefe
| 0 ||  || MBA-I || 18.3 || data-sort-value="0.65" | 650 m || multiple || 2002–2020 || 17 Nov 2020 || 122 || align=left | Disc.: NEAT || 
|- id="2002 RA267" bgcolor=#E9E9E9
| 1 ||  || MBA-M || 18.4 || 1.2 km || multiple || 2002–2020 || 17 Oct 2020 || 89 || align=left | Disc.: NEATAlt.: 2007 YK17 || 
|- id="2002 RB267" bgcolor=#fefefe
| 0 ||  || MBA-I || 18.40 || data-sort-value="0.62" | 620 m || multiple || 1992–2021 || 31 May 2021 || 136 || align=left | Disc.: NEAT || 
|- id="2002 RD267" bgcolor=#E9E9E9
| 0 ||  || MBA-M || 17.55 || 1.3 km || multiple || 2002–2021 || 07 Apr 2021 || 70 || align=left | Disc.: NEAT || 
|- id="2002 RG267" bgcolor=#fefefe
| 3 ||  || MBA-I || 18.6 || data-sort-value="0.57" | 570 m || multiple || 2002–2020 || 16 Nov 2020 || 61 || align=left | Disc.: NEATAlt.: 2013 TM207 || 
|- id="2002 RM267" bgcolor=#E9E9E9
| 0 ||  || MBA-M || 17.7 || 1.6 km || multiple || 2002–2020 || 09 Sep 2020 || 59 || align=left | Disc.: NEAT || 
|- id="2002 RF268" bgcolor=#E9E9E9
| 2 ||  || MBA-M || 18.2 || data-sort-value="0.96" | 960 m || multiple || 2002–2019 || 02 Nov 2019 || 47 || align=left | Disc.: NEAT || 
|- id="2002 RJ268" bgcolor=#E9E9E9
| 0 ||  || MBA-M || 17.96 || 1.1 km || multiple || 2000–2020 || 19 Jan 2020 || 78 || align=left | Disc.: NEAT || 
|- id="2002 RQ268" bgcolor=#E9E9E9
| 0 ||  || MBA-M || 18.1 || 1.3 km || multiple || 2002–2020 || 12 Sep 2020 || 82 || align=left | Disc.: NEATAlt.: 2007 VX284 || 
|- id="2002 RS268" bgcolor=#E9E9E9
| 0 ||  || MBA-M || 17.4 || 1.4 km || multiple || 2002–2021 || 17 Jan 2021 || 146 || align=left | Disc.: NEATAlt.: 2015 VL3 || 
|- id="2002 RU268" bgcolor=#fefefe
| 1 ||  || MBA-I || 18.8 || data-sort-value="0.52" | 520 m || multiple || 1995–2019 || 27 May 2019 || 47 || align=left | Disc.: NEAT || 
|- id="2002 RY268" bgcolor=#d6d6d6
| 0 ||  || MBA-O || 17.0 || 2.2 km || multiple || 2002–2019 || 04 Dec 2019 || 67 || align=left | Disc.: NEAT || 
|- id="2002 RC269" bgcolor=#E9E9E9
| 3 ||  || MBA-M || 18.3 || data-sort-value="0.65" | 650 m || multiple || 2002–2020 || 25 Jan 2020 || 46 || align=left | Disc.: NEATAlt.: 2016 BD55 || 
|- id="2002 RH269" bgcolor=#E9E9E9
| 0 ||  || MBA-M || 17.71 || 1.6 km || multiple || 2002–2022 || 26 Jan 2022 || 91 || align=left | Disc.: NEAT || 
|- id="2002 RK269" bgcolor=#d6d6d6
| 0 ||  || MBA-O || 15.83 || 3.8 km || multiple || 2002–2022 || 25 Jan 2022 || 134 || align=left | Disc.: NEATAlt.: 2010 GY67, 2012 KP47 || 
|- id="2002 RN269" bgcolor=#d6d6d6
| 0 ||  || MBA-O || 16.8 || 2.4 km || multiple || 2002–2021 || 05 Jan 2021 || 71 || align=left | Disc.: NEAT || 
|- id="2002 RS269" bgcolor=#d6d6d6
| 0 ||  || MBA-O || 17.35 || 1.9 km || multiple || 2002–2021 || 10 Apr 2021 || 46 || align=left | Disc.: NEAT || 
|- id="2002 RU269" bgcolor=#E9E9E9
| 1 ||  || MBA-M || 18.2 || 1.3 km || multiple || 2002–2020 || 22 Jul 2020 || 43 || align=left | Disc.: NEATAlt.: 2016 SV77 || 
|- id="2002 RW269" bgcolor=#d6d6d6
| 0 ||  || MBA-O || 16.6 || 2.7 km || multiple || 2002–2020 || 14 Oct 2020 || 53 || align=left | Disc.: NEAT || 
|- id="2002 RZ269" bgcolor=#E9E9E9
| 0 ||  || MBA-M || 18.5 || 1.1 km || multiple || 2002–2016 || 07 Nov 2016 || 49 || align=left | Disc.: NEATAlt.: 2007 VC288 || 
|- id="2002 RA270" bgcolor=#E9E9E9
| 0 ||  || MBA-M || 17.5 || 1.3 km || multiple || 2002–2021 || 16 Jan 2021 || 81 || align=left | Disc.: NEAT || 
|- id="2002 RB270" bgcolor=#fefefe
| 3 ||  || MBA-I || 19.1 || data-sort-value="0.45" | 450 m || multiple || 2002–2010 || 06 Dec 2010 || 36 || align=left | Disc.: NEATAlt.: 2006 UR154 || 
|- id="2002 RC270" bgcolor=#fefefe
| 0 ||  || MBA-I || 18.3 || data-sort-value="0.65" | 650 m || multiple || 2002–2019 || 28 Oct 2019 || 66 || align=left | Disc.: NEAT || 
|- id="2002 RF270" bgcolor=#E9E9E9
| 0 ||  || MBA-M || 17.6 || 1.3 km || multiple || 2002–2020 || 14 Nov 2020 || 89 || align=left | Disc.: NEAT || 
|- id="2002 RJ270" bgcolor=#d6d6d6
| 0 ||  || MBA-O || 16.6 || 2.7 km || multiple || 2002–2020 || 21 Jan 2020 || 82 || align=left | Disc.: NEATAlt.: 2013 UX9 || 
|- id="2002 RL270" bgcolor=#d6d6d6
| 0 ||  || MBA-O || 16.1 || 3.4 km || multiple || 2001–2021 || 12 Jan 2021 || 163 || align=left | Disc.: NEATAlt.: 2013 RT97 || 
|- id="2002 RY270" bgcolor=#E9E9E9
| 0 ||  || MBA-M || 18.1 || 1.0 km || multiple || 2002–2019 || 30 Aug 2019 || 81 || align=left | Disc.: NEATAlt.: 2015 RJ76 || 
|- id="2002 RB271" bgcolor=#E9E9E9
| – ||  || MBA-M || 18.2 || data-sort-value="0.68" | 680 m || single || 13 days || 14 Sep 2002 || 7 || align=left | Disc.: NEAT || 
|- id="2002 RE271" bgcolor=#fefefe
| 3 ||  || MBA-I || 18.8 || data-sort-value="0.52" | 520 m || multiple || 2002–2017 || 26 Nov 2017 || 36 || align=left | Disc.: NEAT || 
|- id="2002 RF271" bgcolor=#fefefe
| 0 ||  || MBA-I || 19.14 || data-sort-value="0.44" | 440 m || multiple || 2002–2021 || 30 Nov 2021 || 55 || align=left | Disc.: NEATAdded on 5 November 2021 || 
|- id="2002 RH271" bgcolor=#fefefe
| 1 ||  || MBA-I || 19.5 || data-sort-value="0.37" | 370 m || multiple || 2002–2018 || 17 Aug 2018 || 25 || align=left | Disc.: NEAT || 
|- id="2002 RN271" bgcolor=#fefefe
| 0 ||  || MBA-I || 19.08 || data-sort-value="0.43" | 450 m || multiple || 2002-2022 || 23 Sep 2022 || 57 || align=left | Disc.: NEAT || 
|- id="2002 RT271" bgcolor=#E9E9E9
| 0 ||  || MBA-M || 18.0 || 1.1 km || multiple || 2002–2019 || 05 Oct 2019 || 64 || align=left | Disc.: NEAT || 
|- id="2002 RF272" bgcolor=#fefefe
| 3 ||  || MBA-I || 19.7 || data-sort-value="0.34" | 340 m || multiple || 2002–2019 || 25 Sep 2019 || 24 || align=left | Disc.: NEAT || 
|- id="2002 RK272" bgcolor=#d6d6d6
| 3 ||  || MBA-O || 17.25 || 2.0 km || multiple || 2002-2020 || 23 Jan 2020 || 37 || align=left | Disc.: NEAT || 
|- id="2002 RO272" bgcolor=#fefefe
| 0 ||  || HUN || 18.78 || data-sort-value="0.52" | 520 m || multiple || 2002–2021 || 05 Nov 2021 || 141 || align=left | Disc.: NEATAlt.: 2013 VE12 || 
|- id="2002 RR272" bgcolor=#E9E9E9
| 0 ||  || MBA-M || 17.9 || data-sort-value="0.78" | 780 m || multiple || 1998–2020 || 22 Jan 2020 || 64 || align=left | Disc.: NEAT || 
|- id="2002 RX272" bgcolor=#E9E9E9
| 2 ||  || MBA-M || 18.2 || data-sort-value="0.68" | 680 m || multiple || 2002–2019 || 05 Nov 2019 || 48 || align=left | Disc.: NEAT || 
|- id="2002 RY272" bgcolor=#E9E9E9
| 0 ||  || MBA-M || 17.7 || data-sort-value="0.86" | 860 m || multiple || 2002–2019 || 31 Dec 2019 || 54 || align=left | Disc.: NEATAlt.: 2011 YM42 || 
|- id="2002 RZ272" bgcolor=#E9E9E9
| 0 ||  || MBA-M || 17.0 || 1.7 km || multiple || 2002–2021 || 11 Jan 2021 || 126 || align=left | Disc.: NEATAlt.: 2014 OC105 || 
|- id="2002 RE273" bgcolor=#d6d6d6
| 0 ||  || MBA-O || 15.9 || 3.7 km || multiple || 2002–2021 || 03 Jan 2021 || 83 || align=left | Disc.: NEATAlt.: 2010 EH152 || 
|- id="2002 RK273" bgcolor=#d6d6d6
| 0 ||  || MBA-O || 16.67 || 2.6 km || multiple || 2000–2022 || 26 Jan 2022 || 102 || align=left | Disc.: NEAT || 
|- id="2002 RM273" bgcolor=#E9E9E9
| 2 ||  || MBA-M || 18.2 || 1.3 km || multiple || 2002–2020 || 11 Oct 2020 || 72 || align=left | Disc.: NEAT || 
|- id="2002 RQ273" bgcolor=#fefefe
| 0 ||  || MBA-I || 18.30 || data-sort-value="0.65" | 650 m || multiple || 2002–2021 || 10 Aug 2021 || 59 || align=left | Disc.: NEATAlt.: 2013 LA22 || 
|- id="2002 RV273" bgcolor=#d6d6d6
| 0 ||  || MBA-O || 17.4 || 1.8 km || multiple || 2000–2018 || 14 Aug 2018 || 46 || align=left | Disc.: NEAT || 
|- id="2002 RZ273" bgcolor=#fefefe
| 3 ||  || MBA-I || 19.6 || data-sort-value="0.36" | 360 m || multiple || 2002–2016 || 02 Nov 2016 || 43 || align=left | Disc.: NEAT || 
|- id="2002 RB274" bgcolor=#E9E9E9
| 1 ||  || MBA-M || 18.4 || data-sort-value="0.62" | 620 m || multiple || 2000–2019 || 26 Nov 2019 || 43 || align=left | Disc.: NEAT || 
|- id="2002 RC274" bgcolor=#d6d6d6
| 0 ||  || MBA-O || 16.6 || 2.7 km || multiple || 2000–2019 || 02 Nov 2019 || 115 || align=left | Disc.: NEATAlt.: 2016 CV191 || 
|- id="2002 RD274" bgcolor=#d6d6d6
| 0 ||  || MBA-O || 16.3 || 3.1 km || multiple || 2002–2021 || 14 Jan 2021 || 131 || align=left | Disc.: NEAT || 
|- id="2002 RF274" bgcolor=#d6d6d6
| 2 ||  || MBA-O || 17.4 || 1.8 km || multiple || 2002–2021 || 12 Jun 2021 || 48 || align=left | Disc.: NEAT || 
|- id="2002 RG274" bgcolor=#E9E9E9
| 0 ||  || MBA-M || 17.7 || 1.2 km || multiple || 2002–2021 || 18 Jan 2021 || 85 || align=left | Disc.: NEAT || 
|- id="2002 RM274" bgcolor=#d6d6d6
| 1 ||  || MBA-O || 17.34 || 1.7 km || multiple || 2002-2018 || 06 Aug 2018 || 32 || align=left | Disc.: NEAT || 
|- id="2002 RQ274" bgcolor=#d6d6d6
| 1 ||  || MBA-O || 17.5 || 1.8 km || multiple || 2002–2020 || 21 Jan 2020 || 19 || align=left | Disc.: NEAT || 
|- id="2002 RT274" bgcolor=#fefefe
| 0 ||  || MBA-I || 18.3 || data-sort-value="0.65" | 650 m || multiple || 2002–2020 || 11 Dec 2020 || 70 || align=left | Disc.: NEAT || 
|- id="2002 RU274" bgcolor=#fefefe
| 0 ||  || MBA-I || 18.2 || data-sort-value="0.68" | 680 m || multiple || 2002–2021 || 17 Jan 2021 || 91 || align=left | Disc.: NEAT || 
|- id="2002 RY274" bgcolor=#d6d6d6
| 0 ||  || MBA-O || 16.8 || 2.4 km || multiple || 2001–2019 || 29 Sep 2019 || 78 || align=left | Disc.: NEAT || 
|- id="2002 RA275" bgcolor=#E9E9E9
| 0 ||  || MBA-M || 17.0 || 2.2 km || multiple || 2002–2020 || 09 Oct 2020 || 102 || align=left | Disc.: NEAT || 
|- id="2002 RB275" bgcolor=#d6d6d6
| 0 ||  || MBA-O || 17.0 || 2.2 km || multiple || 2002–2019 || 29 Nov 2019 || 54 || align=left | Disc.: NEATAlt.: 2013 QW25 || 
|- id="2002 RF275" bgcolor=#E9E9E9
| 0 ||  || MBA-M || 17.67 || data-sort-value="0.87" | 870 m || multiple || 2002–2021 || 11 Apr 2021 || 109 || align=left | Disc.: NEAT || 
|- id="2002 RG275" bgcolor=#E9E9E9
| 0 ||  || MBA-M || 17.4 || 1.8 km || multiple || 2001–2020 || 15 Oct 2020 || 194 || align=left | Disc.: NEAT || 
|- id="2002 RM275" bgcolor=#fefefe
| 0 ||  || MBA-I || 18.0 || data-sort-value="0.75" | 750 m || multiple || 2002–2021 || 15 Jan 2021 || 146 || align=left | Disc.: NEATAlt.: 2011 DA35 || 
|- id="2002 RQ275" bgcolor=#E9E9E9
| 0 ||  || MBA-M || 17.7 || 1.2 km || multiple || 2002–2019 || 01 Sep 2019 || 76 || align=left | Disc.: NEATAlt.: 2015 RO64 || 
|- id="2002 RR275" bgcolor=#fefefe
| 0 ||  || MBA-I || 18.99 || data-sort-value="0.47" | 470 m || multiple || 1992–2021 || 07 Apr 2021 || 39 || align=left | Disc.: NEAT || 
|- id="2002 RU275" bgcolor=#E9E9E9
| 2 ||  || MBA-M || 17.4 || data-sort-value="0.98" | 980 m || multiple || 2002–2019 || 19 Nov 2019 || 24 || align=left | Disc.: NEAT || 
|- id="2002 RV275" bgcolor=#E9E9E9
| 1 ||  || MBA-M || 18.1 || 1.3 km || multiple || 2002–2020 || 15 Aug 2020 || 27 || align=left | Disc.: NEATAdded on 19 October 2020 || 
|- id="2002 RW275" bgcolor=#fefefe
| 0 ||  || MBA-I || 18.0 || data-sort-value="0.75" | 750 m || multiple || 2002–2020 || 06 Dec 2020 || 145 || align=left | Disc.: NEAT || 
|- id="2002 RY275" bgcolor=#d6d6d6
| 0 ||  || MBA-O || 16.9 || 2.3 km || multiple || 2002–2021 || 07 Mar 2021 || 42 || align=left | Disc.: NEATAlt.: 2018 PV40 || 
|- id="2002 RA276" bgcolor=#E9E9E9
| 3 ||  || MBA-M || 19.2 || data-sort-value="0.61" | 610 m || multiple || 2002–2015 || 01 Oct 2015 || 30 || align=left | Disc.: NEAT || 
|- id="2002 RB276" bgcolor=#E9E9E9
| 0 ||  || MBA-M || 19.75 || 340 m || multiple || 2002-2018 || 04 Oct 2018 || 33 || align=left | Disc.: NEATAlt.: 2015 VW212 || 
|- id="2002 RF276" bgcolor=#fefefe
| 5 ||  || MBA-I || 19.4 || data-sort-value="0.39" | 390 m || multiple || 2002–2019 || 26 Sep 2019 || 18 || align=left | Disc.: NEATAdded on 21 August 2021 || 
|- id="2002 RG276" bgcolor=#fefefe
| 1 ||  || MBA-I || 19.97 || data-sort-value="0.30" | 300 m || multiple || 2002-2022 || 02 Sep 2022 || 53 || align=left | Disc.: NEAT || 
|- id="2002 RH276" bgcolor=#d6d6d6
| 0 ||  || MBA-O || 17.52 || 1.7 km || multiple || 2002–2021 || 14 Apr 2021 || 52 || align=left | Disc.: NEATAlt.: 2012 PP39 || 
|- id="2002 RJ276" bgcolor=#fefefe
| 0 ||  || MBA-I || 18.6 || data-sort-value="0.57" | 570 m || multiple || 2002–2020 || 21 Jun 2020 || 74 || align=left | Disc.: NEATAlt.: 2017 ST77 || 
|- id="2002 RL276" bgcolor=#E9E9E9
| 0 ||  || MBA-M || 18.08 || 1.3 km || multiple || 2002–2022 || 25 Jan 2022 || 36 || align=left | Disc.: NEATAlt.: 2015 ME175 || 
|- id="2002 RP276" bgcolor=#E9E9E9
| 3 ||  || MBA-M || 18.3 || data-sort-value="0.65" | 650 m || multiple || 2002–2020 || 22 Jan 2020 || 49 || align=left | Disc.: NEAT || 
|- id="2002 RR276" bgcolor=#fefefe
| 1 ||  || MBA-I || 18.8 || data-sort-value="0.52" | 520 m || multiple || 2002–2019 || 04 Dec 2019 || 51 || align=left | Disc.: NEAT || 
|- id="2002 RW276" bgcolor=#E9E9E9
| 0 ||  || MBA-M || 17.9 || 1.1 km || multiple || 1998–2019 || 23 Sep 2019 || 148 || align=left | Disc.: NEAT || 
|- id="2002 RX276" bgcolor=#d6d6d6
| 1 ||  || MBA-O || 18.61 || 1.1 km || multiple || 2002–2021 || 29 Oct 2021 || 110 || align=left | Disc.: NEATAlt.: 2021 NJ6 || 
|- id="2002 RZ276" bgcolor=#fefefe
| 0 ||  || MBA-I || 18.4 || data-sort-value="0.62" | 620 m || multiple || 2001–2020 || 21 Jul 2020 || 55 || align=left | Disc.: NEATAlt.: 2013 QB76 || 
|- id="2002 RA277" bgcolor=#E9E9E9
| 0 ||  || MBA-M || 18.6 || data-sort-value="0.80" | 800 m || multiple || 1998–2019 || 25 Sep 2019 || 46 || align=left | Disc.: NEAT || 
|- id="2002 RC277" bgcolor=#E9E9E9
| 0 ||  || MBA-M || 18.28 || data-sort-value="0.66" | 660 m || multiple || 1998–2021 || 10 Apr 2021 || 35 || align=left | Disc.: NEAT || 
|- id="2002 RD277" bgcolor=#E9E9E9
| 0 ||  || MBA-M || 18.16 || 1.3 km || multiple || 2000–2022 || 27 Jan 2022 || 51 || align=left | Disc.: NEATAlt.: 2015 MR173 || 
|- id="2002 RE277" bgcolor=#E9E9E9
| 0 ||  || MBA-M || 18.4 || data-sort-value="0.88" | 880 m || multiple || 2002–2019 || 26 Nov 2019 || 82 || align=left | Disc.: NEATAlt.: 2015 XU361 || 
|- id="2002 RF277" bgcolor=#d6d6d6
| 0 ||  || MBA-O || 17.4 || 1.8 km || multiple || 2002–2019 || 25 Nov 2019 || 28 || align=left | Disc.: NEAT || 
|- id="2002 RV277" bgcolor=#E9E9E9
| 0 ||  || MBA-M || 17.9 || data-sort-value="0.78" | 780 m || multiple || 2002–2019 || 05 Nov 2019 || 89 || align=left | Disc.: NEAT || 
|- id="2002 RB278" bgcolor=#fefefe
| 0 ||  || MBA-I || 17.78 || data-sort-value="0.83" | 830 m || multiple || 2002–2021 || 14 Apr 2021 || 99 || align=left | Disc.: NEAT || 
|- id="2002 RD278" bgcolor=#E9E9E9
| 1 ||  || MBA-M || 17.8 || data-sort-value="0.82" | 820 m || multiple || 2002–2019 || 23 Oct 2019 || 36 || align=left | Disc.: NEAT || 
|- id="2002 RK278" bgcolor=#d6d6d6
| 0 ||  || MBA-O || 16.8 || 2.4 km || multiple || 2002–2019 || 27 Nov 2019 || 65 || align=left | Disc.: NEATAlt.: 2008 SG133 || 
|- id="2002 RS278" bgcolor=#E9E9E9
| 3 ||  || MBA-M || 18.5 || data-sort-value="0.59" | 590 m || multiple || 2002–2016 || 11 Jan 2016 || 20 || align=left | Disc.: NEAT || 
|- id="2002 RZ278" bgcolor=#fefefe
| 2 ||  || MBA-I || 18.1 || data-sort-value="0.71" | 710 m || multiple || 2002–2019 || 02 Dec 2019 || 48 || align=left | Disc.: NEAT || 
|- id="2002 RA279" bgcolor=#fefefe
| 2 ||  || MBA-I || 18.8 || data-sort-value="0.52" | 520 m || multiple || 2002–2019 || 02 Jun 2019 || 47 || align=left | Disc.: NEATAlt.: 2009 SE273 || 
|- id="2002 RF279" bgcolor=#d6d6d6
| 0 ||  || MBA-O || 16.35 || 3.0 km || multiple || 2002–2021 || 13 Apr 2021 || 120 || align=left | Disc.: NEAT || 
|- id="2002 RM279" bgcolor=#E9E9E9
| 0 ||  || MBA-M || 17.2 || 1.5 km || multiple || 2002–2020 || 12 Dec 2020 || 88 || align=left | Disc.: NEATAlt.: 2013 AF153 || 
|- id="2002 RU279" bgcolor=#E9E9E9
| 1 ||  || MBA-M || 17.7 || 1.2 km || multiple || 2002–2020 || 27 Jan 2020 || 103 || align=left | Disc.: NEATAlt.: 2019 SQ11 || 
|- id="2002 RV279" bgcolor=#fefefe
| 0 ||  || MBA-I || 18.7 || data-sort-value="0.54" | 540 m || multiple || 2002–2020 || 24 Jun 2020 || 32 || align=left | Disc.: NEATAdded on 21 August 2021 || 
|- id="2002 RZ279" bgcolor=#fefefe
| 0 ||  || MBA-I || 19.11 || data-sort-value="0.45" | 450 m || multiple || 2002–2021 || 09 Nov 2021 || 36 || align=left | Disc.: NEAT || 
|- id="2002 RA280" bgcolor=#E9E9E9
| 0 ||  || MBA-M || 17.5 || 1.3 km || multiple || 2002–2019 || 06 Sep 2019 || 98 || align=left | Disc.: NEATAlt.: 2011 WF122 || 
|- id="2002 RJ280" bgcolor=#E9E9E9
| 0 ||  || MBA-M || 17.3 || 1.5 km || multiple || 2000–2019 || 25 Sep 2019 || 85 || align=left | Disc.: NEATAlt.: 2011 SG105 || 
|- id="2002 RL280" bgcolor=#fefefe
| 3 ||  || MBA-I || 19.6 || data-sort-value="0.36" | 360 m || multiple || 2002–2018 || 14 Sep 2018 || 22 || align=left | Disc.: NEAT || 
|- id="2002 RM280" bgcolor=#E9E9E9
| 0 ||  || MBA-M || 17.1 || 1.1 km || multiple || 1998–2021 || 13 May 2021 || 155 || align=left | Disc.: NEATAlt.: 1998 UE9, 2004 CC112, 2006 SO30, 2010 JD134 || 
|- id="2002 RO280" bgcolor=#fefefe
| 0 ||  || MBA-I || 18.23 || data-sort-value="0.67" | 670 m || multiple || 2002–2021 || 26 Oct 2021 || 82 || align=left | Disc.: NEATAdded on 22 July 2020 || 
|- id="2002 RQ280" bgcolor=#fefefe
| 0 ||  || MBA-I || 18.50 || data-sort-value="0.59" | 590 m || multiple || 2002–2022 || 27 Jan 2022 || 49 || align=left | Disc.: NEAT || 
|- id="2002 RR280" bgcolor=#E9E9E9
| 2 ||  || MBA-M || 18.6 || data-sort-value="0.57" | 570 m || multiple || 2002–2018 || 07 Aug 2018 || 38 || align=left | Disc.: NEATAlt.: 2014 QW337 || 
|- id="2002 RS280" bgcolor=#d6d6d6
| 0 ||  || MBA-O || 16.84 || 2.4 km || multiple || 2002–2021 || 08 Sep 2021 || 105 || align=left | Disc.: NEAT || 
|- id="2002 RU280" bgcolor=#fefefe
| 0 ||  || MBA-I || 18.84 || data-sort-value="0.51" | 510 m || multiple || 2002–2020 || 20 Jul 2020 || 35 || align=left | Disc.: NEAT || 
|- id="2002 RB281" bgcolor=#FA8072
| 0 ||  || MCA || 18.7 || data-sort-value="0.54" | 540 m || multiple || 2002–2021 || 15 Jun 2021 || 69 || align=left | Disc.: NEAT || 
|- id="2002 RG281" bgcolor=#E9E9E9
| 1 ||  || MBA-M || 17.4 || 1.4 km || multiple || 2002–2020 || 10 Nov 2020 || 106 || align=left | Disc.: NEAT || 
|- id="2002 RH281" bgcolor=#FA8072
| 0 ||  || MCA || 19.19 || data-sort-value="0.43" | 430 m || multiple || 2002–2019 || 25 Sep 2019 || 46 || align=left | Disc.: NEATAlt.: 2009 US41 || 
|- id="2002 RM281" bgcolor=#E9E9E9
| 0 ||  || MBA-M || 17.6 || 1.3 km || multiple || 2002–2021 || 04 Jan 2021 || 72 || align=left | Disc.: NEATAlt.: 2011 UB47 || 
|- id="2002 RO281" bgcolor=#fefefe
| 0 ||  || MBA-I || 18.7 || data-sort-value="0.54" | 540 m || multiple || 2002–2020 || 05 Nov 2020 || 56 || align=left | Disc.: NEAT || 
|- id="2002 RP281" bgcolor=#fefefe
| 4 ||  || MBA-I || 19.5 || data-sort-value="0.37" | 370 m || multiple || 2002–2019 || 26 Sep 2019 || 22 || align=left | Disc.: NEAT || 
|- id="2002 RQ281" bgcolor=#d6d6d6
| 0 ||  || MBA-O || 17.0 || 2.2 km || multiple || 2002–2018 || 05 Oct 2018 || 54 || align=left | Disc.: NEAT || 
|- id="2002 RS281" bgcolor=#fefefe
| 2 ||  || MBA-I || 19.4 || data-sort-value="0.39" | 390 m || multiple || 2002–2019 || 25 Sep 2019 || 26 || align=left | Disc.: NEAT || 
|- id="2002 RT281" bgcolor=#fefefe
| 1 ||  || MBA-I || 19.0 || data-sort-value="0.47" | 470 m || multiple || 2002–2020 || 15 Sep 2020 || 36 || align=left | Disc.: NEATAdded on 19 October 2020 || 
|- id="2002 RU281" bgcolor=#d6d6d6
| 0 ||  || MBA-O || 16.48 || 2.8 km || multiple || 2002–2021 || 14 Apr 2021 || 159 || align=left | Disc.: NEATAlt.: 2008 UR311 || 
|- id="2002 RV281" bgcolor=#E9E9E9
| 3 ||  || MBA-M || 18.1 || data-sort-value="0.71" | 710 m || multiple || 2002–2020 || 19 Jan 2020 || 56 || align=left | Disc.: NEAT || 
|- id="2002 RA282" bgcolor=#E9E9E9
| 0 ||  || MBA-M || 17.39 || data-sort-value="0.99" | 990 m || multiple || 1998–2021 || 14 May 2021 || 73 || align=left | Disc.: NEATAdded on 22 July 2020 || 
|- id="2002 RE282" bgcolor=#fefefe
| 1 ||  || MBA-I || 18.9 || data-sort-value="0.49" | 490 m || multiple || 2002–2020 || 16 Nov 2020 || 20 || align=left | Disc.: NEATAdded on 9 March 2021 || 
|- id="2002 RK282" bgcolor=#fefefe
| 3 ||  || MBA-I || 18.6 || data-sort-value="0.57" | 570 m || multiple || 2002–2020 || 04 Nov 2020 || 27 || align=left | Disc.: NEAT || 
|- id="2002 RL282" bgcolor=#E9E9E9
| 0 ||  || MBA-M || 17.0 || 1.7 km || multiple || 2002–2020 || 14 Dec 2020 || 94 || align=left | Disc.: NEAT || 
|- id="2002 RP282" bgcolor=#E9E9E9
| 2 ||  || MBA-M || 18.2 || data-sort-value="0.68" | 680 m || multiple || 2002–2020 || 26 Jan 2020 || 52 || align=left | Disc.: NEAT || 
|- id="2002 RR282" bgcolor=#d6d6d6
| 0 ||  || MBA-O || 16.44 || 2.9 km || multiple || 2002–2021 || 08 May 2021 || 110 || align=left | Disc.: NEAT || 
|- id="2002 RB283" bgcolor=#fefefe
| 0 ||  || MBA-I || 19.05 || data-sort-value="0.46" | 460 m || multiple || 2002–2022 || 25 Jan 2022 || 31 || align=left | Disc.: NEAT || 
|- id="2002 RC283" bgcolor=#fefefe
| 1 ||  || MBA-I || 18.4 || data-sort-value="0.62" | 620 m || multiple || 2002–2018 || 09 Nov 2018 || 41 || align=left | Disc.: NEATAlt.: 2006 SB107, 2010 UY19 || 
|- id="2002 RE283" bgcolor=#d6d6d6
| 0 ||  || MBA-O || 16.8 || 2.4 km || multiple || 2002–2021 || 18 Jan 2021 || 86 || align=left | Disc.: NEAT || 
|- id="2002 RJ283" bgcolor=#fefefe
| 3 ||  || MBA-I || 18.4 || data-sort-value="0.62" | 620 m || multiple || 2002–2013 || 06 Oct 2013 || 16 || align=left | Disc.: NEAT || 
|- id="2002 RM283" bgcolor=#fefefe
| 5 ||  || MBA-I || 19.8 || data-sort-value="0.33" | 330 m || multiple || 2002–2020 || 23 Sep 2020 || 29 || align=left | Disc.: NEATAlt.: 2020 PQ74 || 
|- id="2002 RO283" bgcolor=#d6d6d6
| 3 ||  || MBA-O || 17.6 || 1.7 km || multiple || 2002–2017 || 25 Oct 2017 || 32 || align=left | Disc.: NEAT || 
|- id="2002 RP283" bgcolor=#E9E9E9
| 1 ||  || MBA-M || 17.9 || data-sort-value="0.78" | 780 m || multiple || 2002–2018 || 10 Jul 2018 || 52 || align=left | Disc.: NEAT || 
|- id="2002 RQ283" bgcolor=#d6d6d6
| 0 ||  || MBA-O || 16.3 || 3.1 km || multiple || 2002–2019 || 24 Dec 2019 || 45 || align=left | Disc.: NEAT || 
|- id="2002 RS283" bgcolor=#d6d6d6
| 0 ||  || MBA-O || 16.6 || 2.7 km || multiple || 2002–2020 || 11 May 2020 || 52 || align=left | Disc.: NEAT || 
|- id="2002 RY283" bgcolor=#E9E9E9
| 0 ||  || MBA-M || 18.6 || data-sort-value="0.80" | 800 m || multiple || 2002–2019 || 08 Oct 2019 || 39 || align=left | Disc.: NEAT || 
|- id="2002 RB284" bgcolor=#d6d6d6
| 0 ||  || MBA-O || 16.6 || 2.7 km || multiple || 2002–2020 || 16 Mar 2020 || 95 || align=left | Disc.: NEATAlt.: 2012 QP11 || 
|- id="2002 RD284" bgcolor=#d6d6d6
| 0 ||  || MBA-O || 16.10 || 3.4 km || multiple || 2002–2021 || 15 May 2021 || 184 || align=left | Disc.: NEATAlt.: 2005 ES249 || 
|- id="2002 RF284" bgcolor=#E9E9E9
| 0 ||  || MBA-M || 18.2 || data-sort-value="0.96" | 960 m || multiple || 2002–2019 || 27 Oct 2019 || 58 || align=left | Disc.: NEATAlt.: 2015 TN258 || 
|- id="2002 RG284" bgcolor=#d6d6d6
| 0 ||  || MBA-O || 16.2 || 3.2 km || multiple || 2000–2021 || 18 Jan 2021 || 172 || align=left | Disc.: NEATAlt.: 2006 FU41, 2007 TA320 || 
|- id="2002 RL284" bgcolor=#E9E9E9
| 0 ||  || MBA-M || 17.3 || 1.5 km || multiple || 2002–2019 || 22 Sep 2019 || 50 || align=left | Disc.: NEAT || 
|- id="2002 RM284" bgcolor=#d6d6d6
| 0 ||  || MBA-O || 16.8 || 2.4 km || multiple || 2002–2021 || 12 Jan 2021 || 77 || align=left | Disc.: NEATAlt.: 2010 KS131 || 
|- id="2002 RR284" bgcolor=#d6d6d6
| 0 ||  || MBA-O || 17.0 || 2.2 km || multiple || 2002–2019 || 20 Oct 2019 || 56 || align=left | Disc.: NEAT || 
|- id="2002 RB285" bgcolor=#fefefe
| 3 ||  || MBA-I || 19.0 || data-sort-value="0.47" | 470 m || multiple || 2002–2017 || 22 Nov 2017 || 33 || align=left | Disc.: NEATAlt.: 2013 SS11 || 
|- id="2002 RH285" bgcolor=#d6d6d6
| 0 ||  || MBA-O || 16.4 || 2.9 km || multiple || 2002–2021 || 10 Jan 2021 || 119 || align=left | Disc.: NEATAlt.: 2008 UQ192, 2012 MJ1, 2016 DU4 || 
|- id="2002 RM285" bgcolor=#E9E9E9
| 0 ||  || MBA-M || 18.9 || data-sort-value="0.70" | 700 m || multiple || 2002–2019 || 26 Nov 2019 || 43 || align=left | Disc.: NEAT || 
|- id="2002 RN285" bgcolor=#E9E9E9
| 0 ||  || MBA-M || 17.8 || 1.2 km || multiple || 2002–2019 || 01 Nov 2019 || 62 || align=left | Disc.: NEAT || 
|- id="2002 RQ285" bgcolor=#d6d6d6
| 0 ||  || MBA-O || 16.94 || 2.3 km || multiple || 2002–2022 || 27 Jan 2022 || 54 || align=left | Disc.: NEAT || 
|- id="2002 RT285" bgcolor=#fefefe
| 1 ||  || MBA-I || 18.7 || data-sort-value="0.54" | 540 m || multiple || 1995–2021 || 18 Jan 2021 || 46 || align=left | Disc.: NEATAdded on 9 March 2021 || 
|- id="2002 RU285" bgcolor=#fefefe
| 4 ||  || MBA-I || 19.1 || data-sort-value="0.45" | 450 m || multiple || 2002–2020 || 15 Oct 2020 || 39 || align=left | Disc.: NEATAdded on 9 March 2021Alt.: 2020 RE35 || 
|- id="2002 RW285" bgcolor=#E9E9E9
| 3 ||  || MBA-M || 18.3 || data-sort-value="0.92" | 920 m || multiple || 2002–2019 || 22 Oct 2019 || 20 || align=left | Disc.: NEATAdded on 21 August 2021 || 
|- id="2002 RY285" bgcolor=#d6d6d6
| 0 ||  || MBA-O || 16.0 || 3.5 km || multiple || 1992–2020 || 21 Jan 2020 || 168 || align=left | Disc.: NEATAlt.: 2012 HM49 || 
|- id="2002 RB286" bgcolor=#fefefe
| 2 ||  || HUN || 18.4 || data-sort-value="0.62" | 620 m || multiple || 2002–2018 || 28 Nov 2018 || 94 || align=left | Disc.: NEATAlt.: 2010 SY21 || 
|- id="2002 RC286" bgcolor=#E9E9E9
| 0 ||  || MBA-M || 16.9 || 1.8 km || multiple || 2002–2019 || 21 Oct 2019 || 75 || align=left | Disc.: NEAT || 
|- id="2002 RD286" bgcolor=#E9E9E9
| 0 ||  || MBA-M || 16.85 || 2.4 km || multiple || 2001–2022 || 21 Jan 2022 || 130 || align=left | Disc.: NEAT || 
|- id="2002 RE286" bgcolor=#E9E9E9
| 0 ||  || MBA-M || 17.1 || 1.6 km || multiple || 2002–2021 || 08 Jan 2021 || 102 || align=left | Disc.: NEAT || 
|- id="2002 RH286" bgcolor=#fefefe
| 1 ||  || MBA-I || 17.8 || data-sort-value="0.82" | 820 m || multiple || 2002–2020 || 17 Dec 2020 || 50 || align=left | Disc.: AMOS || 
|- id="2002 RJ286" bgcolor=#d6d6d6
| 0 ||  || MBA-O || 16.3 || 3.1 km || multiple || 2002–2020 || 22 Nov 2020 || 84 || align=left | Disc.: NEAT || 
|- id="2002 RK286" bgcolor=#fefefe
| 0 ||  || MBA-I || 17.9 || data-sort-value="0.78" | 780 m || multiple || 1995–2020 || 07 Dec 2020 || 122 || align=left | Disc.: NEAT || 
|- id="2002 RL286" bgcolor=#fefefe
| 0 ||  || MBA-I || 17.85 || data-sort-value="0.80" | 800 m || multiple || 2002–2021 || 14 Apr 2021 || 76 || align=left | Disc.: NEATAlt.: 2014 DP120 || 
|- id="2002 RN286" bgcolor=#E9E9E9
| 0 ||  || MBA-M || 17.7 || 1.2 km || multiple || 2002–2019 || 29 Oct 2019 || 65 || align=left | Disc.: NEAT || 
|- id="2002 RQ286" bgcolor=#fefefe
| 0 ||  || MBA-I || 18.85 || data-sort-value="0.50" | 500 m || multiple || 2002–2021 || 13 Apr 2021 || 49 || align=left | Disc.: NEAT || 
|- id="2002 RR286" bgcolor=#E9E9E9
| 1 ||  || MBA-M || 17.8 || 1.2 km || multiple || 2002–2020 || 10 Dec 2020 || 70 || align=left | Disc.: NEATAlt.: 2011 UY96 || 
|- id="2002 RS286" bgcolor=#E9E9E9
| – ||  || MBA-M || 19.0 || data-sort-value="0.47" | 470 m || single || 16 days || 15 Sep 2002 || 12 || align=left | Disc.: NEAT || 
|- id="2002 RT286" bgcolor=#E9E9E9
| 3 ||  || MBA-M || 17.8 || 1.5 km || multiple || 2002–2020 || 05 Nov 2020 || 43 || align=left | Disc.: NEAT || 
|- id="2002 RU286" bgcolor=#d6d6d6
| 0 ||  || MBA-O || 16.6 || 2.7 km || multiple || 2002–2020 || 26 Mar 2020 || 88 || align=left | Disc.: NEATAlt.: 2015 FC364 || 
|- id="2002 RW286" bgcolor=#E9E9E9
| 2 ||  || MBA-M || 17.9 || 1.1 km || multiple || 2002–2019 || 10 Jul 2019 || 41 || align=left | Disc.: NEATAlt.: 2015 RF96 || 
|- id="2002 RX286" bgcolor=#fefefe
| 0 ||  || MBA-I || 18.4 || data-sort-value="0.62" | 620 m || multiple || 2002–2021 || 09 Jan 2021 || 64 || align=left | Disc.: NEAT || 
|- id="2002 RY286" bgcolor=#E9E9E9
| 0 ||  || MBA-M || 17.3 || 1.5 km || multiple || 2002–2021 || 18 Jan 2021 || 87 || align=left | Disc.: NEATAlt.: 2007 YH75, 2015 VB94 || 
|- id="2002 RZ286" bgcolor=#fefefe
| 1 ||  || MBA-I || 19.2 || data-sort-value="0.43" | 430 m || multiple || 2002–2017 || 17 Nov 2017 || 33 || align=left | Disc.: NEAT || 
|- id="2002 RA287" bgcolor=#d6d6d6
| 0 ||  || MBA-O || 16.4 || 2.9 km || multiple || 2002–2019 || 31 Oct 2019 || 146 || align=left | Disc.: NEAT || 
|- id="2002 RC287" bgcolor=#fefefe
| 0 ||  || MBA-I || 18.53 || data-sort-value="0.58" | 580 m || multiple || 2002–2021 || 15 Apr 2021 || 66 || align=left | Disc.: NEATAlt.: 2002 TW319, 2014 DT24 || 
|- id="2002 RE287" bgcolor=#d6d6d6
| 0 ||  || MBA-O || 16.97 || 2.2 km || multiple || 2002–2021 || 18 May 2021 || 85 || align=left | Disc.: NEAT || 
|- id="2002 RF287" bgcolor=#E9E9E9
| 3 ||  || MBA-M || 18.8 || data-sort-value="0.52" | 520 m || multiple || 2002–2019 || 18 Nov 2019 || 20 || align=left | Disc.: NEAT || 
|- id="2002 RG287" bgcolor=#fefefe
| 2 ||  || MBA-I || 18.6 || data-sort-value="0.57" | 570 m || multiple || 2013–2017 || 10 Dec 2017 || 33 || align=left | Disc.: NEAT || 
|- id="2002 RJ287" bgcolor=#fefefe
| 1 ||  || MBA-I || 19.0 || data-sort-value="0.47" | 470 m || multiple || 2002–2021 || 30 Oct 2021 || 41 || align=left | Disc.: NEAT || 
|- id="2002 RK287" bgcolor=#d6d6d6
| 1 ||  || MBA-O || 18.33 || 1.2 km || multiple || 2002-2022 || 26 Jul 2022 || 36 || align=left | Disc.: NEAT || 
|- id="2002 RP287" bgcolor=#E9E9E9
| 0 ||  || MBA-M || 17.06 || 2.2 km || multiple || 2002–2021 || 09 Nov 2021 || 100 || align=left | Disc.: NEATAlt.: 2014 EF2 || 
|- id="2002 RR287" bgcolor=#fefefe
| 2 ||  || MBA-I || 19.1 || data-sort-value="0.45" | 450 m || multiple || 2002–2019 || 29 Oct 2019 || 42 || align=left | Disc.: NEAT || 
|- id="2002 RW287" bgcolor=#fefefe
| 3 ||  || MBA-I || 19.2 || data-sort-value="0.43" | 430 m || multiple || 2002–2018 || 15 Sep 2018 || 41 || align=left | Disc.: NEATAlt.: 2015 UO20 || 
|- id="2002 RZ287" bgcolor=#d6d6d6
| – ||  || MBA-O || 17.0 || 2.2 km || single || 3 days || 15 Sep 2002 || 9 || align=left | Disc.: NEAT || 
|- id="2002 RB288" bgcolor=#E9E9E9
| 0 ||  || MBA-M || 17.48 || 1.8 km || multiple || 2002–2021 || 23 Nov 2021 || 122 || align=left | Disc.: NEAT || 
|- id="2002 RG288" bgcolor=#E9E9E9
| 0 ||  || MBA-M || 16.79 || 1.3 km || multiple || 2002–2021 || 14 Apr 2021 || 172 || align=left | Disc.: NEATAlt.: 2014 QT165 || 
|- id="2002 RH288" bgcolor=#fefefe
| 0 ||  || MBA-I || 18.3 || data-sort-value="0.65" | 650 m || multiple || 1995–2020 || 20 Nov 2020 || 49 || align=left | Disc.: SpacewatchAlt.: 1995 SX65 || 
|- id="2002 RJ288" bgcolor=#E9E9E9
| 0 ||  || MBA-M || 17.88 || 1.1 km || multiple || 2002-2022 || 24 May 2022 || 38 || align=left | Disc.: NEAT || 
|- id="2002 RU288" bgcolor=#d6d6d6
| 0 ||  || MBA-O || 15.73 || 4.0 km || multiple || 2002–2021 || 27 Nov 2021 || 256 || align=left | Disc.: NEATAlt.: 2013 MC1 || 
|- id="2002 RV288" bgcolor=#fefefe
| 0 ||  || MBA-I || 17.7 || data-sort-value="0.86" | 860 m || multiple || 1995–2020 || 09 Oct 2020 || 155 || align=left | Disc.: NEATAlt.: 2013 RA28 || 
|- id="2002 RW288" bgcolor=#fefefe
| 1 ||  || MBA-I || 18.7 || data-sort-value="0.54" | 540 m || multiple || 2002–2019 || 05 Nov 2019 || 46 || align=left | Disc.: NEAT || 
|- id="2002 RX288" bgcolor=#E9E9E9
| 0 ||  || MBA-M || 17.60 || 1.3 km || multiple || 2002–2022 || 26 Jan 2022 || 80 || align=left | Disc.: NEAT || 
|- id="2002 RZ288" bgcolor=#d6d6d6
| 0 ||  || MBA-O || 16.3 || 3.1 km || multiple || 2002–2019 || 24 Dec 2019 || 129 || align=left | Disc.: NEATAlt.: 2016 CB116 || 
|- id="2002 RA289" bgcolor=#d6d6d6
| 0 ||  || MBA-O || 16.58 || 2.7 km || multiple || 2002–2021 || 13 Jul 2021 || 158 || align=left | Disc.: NEATAlt.: 2010 JT35 || 
|- id="2002 RD289" bgcolor=#d6d6d6
| 0 ||  || MBA-O || 15.83 || 3.8 km || multiple || 2002–2021 || 14 Apr 2021 || 237 || align=left | Disc.: NEATAlt.: 2005 EY98 || 
|- id="2002 RE289" bgcolor=#d6d6d6
| 0 ||  || MBA-O || 16.42 || 2.9 km || multiple || 1991–2021 || 03 Apr 2021 || 183 || align=left | Disc.: NEATAlt.: 2013 RA88 || 
|- id="2002 RG289" bgcolor=#E9E9E9
| 0 ||  || MBA-M || 17.46 || data-sort-value="0.96" | 960 m || multiple || 2002–2021 || 15 May 2021 || 149 || align=left | Disc.: NEATAlt.: 2006 SM166, 2010 RK150 || 
|- id="2002 RH289" bgcolor=#fefefe
| 0 ||  || MBA-I || 18.27 || data-sort-value="0.66" | 660 m || multiple || 1995–2021 || 15 Apr 2021 || 106 || align=left | Disc.: NEATAlt.: 2009 WX67 || 
|- id="2002 RJ289" bgcolor=#d6d6d6
| 0 ||  || MBA-O || 15.8 || 3.9 km || multiple || 2002–2021 || 18 Jan 2021 || 222 || align=left | Disc.: NEATAlt.: 2005 ET18 || 
|- id="2002 RK289" bgcolor=#fefefe
| 1 ||  || MBA-I || 19.1 || data-sort-value="0.45" | 450 m || multiple || 2002–2019 || 25 Sep 2019 || 32 || align=left | Disc.: NEAT || 
|- id="2002 RO289" bgcolor=#fefefe
| 1 ||  || MBA-I || 18.4 || data-sort-value="0.62" | 620 m || multiple || 2002–2015 || 03 Nov 2015 || 23 || align=left | Disc.: NEAT || 
|- id="2002 RP289" bgcolor=#fefefe
| 0 ||  || MBA-I || 17.5 || data-sort-value="0.94" | 940 m || multiple || 1992–2021 || 24 Jan 2021 || 131 || align=left | Disc.: NEATAlt.: 2009 SJ237 || 
|- id="2002 RV289" bgcolor=#d6d6d6
| 0 ||  || MBA-O || 17.1 || 2.1 km || multiple || 2002–2019 || 27 Oct 2019 || 48 || align=left | Disc.: NEATAlt.: 2013 RF39 || 
|- id="2002 RW289" bgcolor=#fefefe
| 0 ||  || MBA-I || 18.8 || data-sort-value="0.52" | 520 m || multiple || 2002–2019 || 28 Nov 2019 || 82 || align=left | Disc.: NEAT || 
|- id="2002 RX289" bgcolor=#fefefe
| 0 ||  || MBA-I || 18.2 || data-sort-value="0.68" | 680 m || multiple || 2002–2021 || 18 Jan 2021 || 65 || align=left | Disc.: AMOS || 
|- id="2002 RZ289" bgcolor=#E9E9E9
| 1 ||  || MBA-M || 18.3 || data-sort-value="0.92" | 920 m || multiple || 2002–2020 || 10 Dec 2020 || 47 || align=left | Disc.: NEAT || 
|- id="2002 RA290" bgcolor=#E9E9E9
| 0 ||  || MBA-M || 17.9 || 1.1 km || multiple || 2002–2019 || 25 Sep 2019 || 63 || align=left | Disc.: NEAT || 
|- id="2002 RB290" bgcolor=#E9E9E9
| 0 ||  || MBA-M || 17.55 || 1.7 km || multiple || 2002–2022 || 25 Jan 2022 || 102 || align=left | Disc.: NEAT || 
|- id="2002 RC290" bgcolor=#d6d6d6
| 0 ||  || MBA-O || 16.0 || 3.5 km || multiple || 2002–2021 || 18 Jan 2021 || 175 || align=left | Disc.: NEATAlt.: 2009 XF11 || 
|- id="2002 RD290" bgcolor=#E9E9E9
| 0 ||  || MBA-M || 16.91 || 2.3 km || multiple || 2002–2021 || 26 Nov 2021 || 117 || align=left | Disc.: NEAT || 
|- id="2002 RE290" bgcolor=#d6d6d6
| 0 ||  || MBA-O || 16.7 || 2.5 km || multiple || 2002–2021 || 24 Mar 2021 || 126 || align=left | Disc.: NEATAlt.: 2013 RJ25 || 
|- id="2002 RL290" bgcolor=#d6d6d6
| 0 ||  || MBA-O || 16.56 || 2.7 km || multiple || 2002–2022 || 27 Jan 2022 || 96 || align=left | Disc.: NEATAlt.: 2013 SC77 || 
|- id="2002 RP290" bgcolor=#E9E9E9
| 0 ||  || MBA-M || 17.6 || 1.7 km || multiple || 2002–2020 || 05 Nov 2020 || 158 || align=left | Disc.: NEAT || 
|- id="2002 RR290" bgcolor=#fefefe
| 0 ||  || MBA-I || 16.62 || 1.4 km || multiple || 2002–2022 || 12 Jan 2022 || 609 || align=left | Disc.: NEATAlt.: 2011 BZ40 || 
|- id="2002 RU290" bgcolor=#d6d6d6
| 0 ||  || MBA-O || 16.6 || 2.7 km || multiple || 2002–2019 || 01 Nov 2019 || 75 || align=left | Disc.: NEAT || 
|- id="2002 RV290" bgcolor=#fefefe
| 0 ||  || MBA-I || 17.7 || data-sort-value="0.86" | 860 m || multiple || 2002–2021 || 06 Jan 2021 || 98 || align=left | Disc.: NEAT || 
|- id="2002 RX290" bgcolor=#fefefe
| 0 ||  || MBA-I || 17.9 || data-sort-value="0.78" | 780 m || multiple || 2002–2021 || 07 Jan 2021 || 106 || align=left | Disc.: NEAT || 
|- id="2002 RZ290" bgcolor=#E9E9E9
| 0 ||  || MBA-M || 17.4 || data-sort-value="0.98" | 980 m || multiple || 2002–2021 || 12 Jan 2021 || 113 || align=left | Disc.: NEAT || 
|- id="2002 RD291" bgcolor=#d6d6d6
| 0 ||  || MBA-O || 16.82 || 2.4 km || multiple || 2002–2021 || 13 May 2021 || 92 || align=left | Disc.: NEAT || 
|- id="2002 RG291" bgcolor=#E9E9E9
| 0 ||  || MBA-M || 17.7 || 1.2 km || multiple || 2002–2021 || 17 Jan 2021 || 149 || align=left | Disc.: NEAT || 
|- id="2002 RH291" bgcolor=#fefefe
| 0 ||  || MBA-I || 18.12 || data-sort-value="0.71" | 710 m || multiple || 2002–2021 || 11 Apr 2021 || 131 || align=left | Disc.: NEAT || 
|- id="2002 RN291" bgcolor=#fefefe
| 0 ||  || MBA-I || 17.4 || data-sort-value="0.98" | 980 m || multiple || 2002–2020 || 20 Dec 2020 || 223 || align=left | Disc.: AMOSAlt.: 2006 WM85 || 
|- id="2002 RP291" bgcolor=#d6d6d6
| 0 ||  || MBA-O || 16.27 || 3.1 km || multiple || 2002–2021 || 07 Apr 2021 || 109 || align=left | Disc.: NEAT || 
|- id="2002 RQ291" bgcolor=#E9E9E9
| 0 ||  || MBA-M || 17.9 || 1.1 km || multiple || 2002–2020 || 10 Dec 2020 || 56 || align=left | Disc.: NEAT || 
|- id="2002 RS291" bgcolor=#fefefe
| 0 ||  || MBA-I || 17.0 || 1.2 km || multiple || 1991–2020 || 07 Dec 2020 || 184 || align=left | Disc.: NEAT || 
|- id="2002 RT291" bgcolor=#d6d6d6
| 0 ||  || MBA-O || 16.97 || 2.2 km || multiple || 2002–2021 || 31 May 2021 || 80 || align=left | Disc.: NEAT || 
|- id="2002 RU291" bgcolor=#E9E9E9
| 3 ||  || MBA-M || 17.7 || 1.6 km || multiple || 2002–2020 || 15 Oct 2020 || 69 || align=left | Disc.: AMOS || 
|- id="2002 RV291" bgcolor=#fefefe
| 1 ||  || MBA-I || 18.7 || data-sort-value="0.54" | 540 m || multiple || 2002–2021 || 18 Jan 2021 || 50 || align=left | Disc.: NEAT || 
|- id="2002 RX291" bgcolor=#E9E9E9
| 3 ||  || MBA-M || 17.8 || 1.5 km || multiple || 2002–2020 || 15 Dec 2020 || 38 || align=left | Disc.: NEAT || 
|- id="2002 RZ291" bgcolor=#E9E9E9
| 0 ||  || MBA-M || 17.3 || 1.5 km || multiple || 2002–2021 || 14 Jan 2021 || 165 || align=left | Disc.: AMOS || 
|- id="2002 RA292" bgcolor=#E9E9E9
| 0 ||  || MBA-M || 17.18 || 2.0 km || multiple || 2002–2021 || 30 Nov 2021 || 148 || align=left | Disc.: NEATAlt.: 2007 VM278 || 
|- id="2002 RF292" bgcolor=#E9E9E9
| 0 ||  || MBA-M || 16.7 || 1.9 km || multiple || 1997–2019 || 30 Nov 2019 || 200 || align=left | Disc.: NEATAlt.: 2010 LR108 || 
|- id="2002 RG292" bgcolor=#E9E9E9
| – ||  || MBA-M || 18.5 || data-sort-value="0.59" | 590 m || single || 27 days || 12 Sep 2002 || 13 || align=left | Disc.: NEAT || 
|- id="2002 RJ292" bgcolor=#E9E9E9
| 0 ||  || MBA-M || 16.96 || 2.3 km || multiple || 2002–2021 || 09 Dec 2021 || 173 || align=left | Disc.: NEATAlt.: 2009 DG69 || 
|- id="2002 RN292" bgcolor=#E9E9E9
| 0 ||  || MBA-M || 17.71 || 1.6 km || multiple || 2002–2022 || 06 Jan 2022 || 77 || align=left | Disc.: NEAT || 
|- id="2002 RO292" bgcolor=#d6d6d6
| 0 ||  || MBA-O || 15.7 || 4.0 km || multiple || 2002–2021 || 16 Jan 2021 || 179 || align=left | Disc.: NEATAlt.: 2011 GC42 || 
|- id="2002 RU292" bgcolor=#fefefe
| 0 ||  || MBA-I || 18.0 || data-sort-value="0.75" | 750 m || multiple || 2002–2020 || 17 Nov 2020 || 166 || align=left | Disc.: NEAT || 
|- id="2002 RW292" bgcolor=#E9E9E9
| 0 ||  || MBA-M || 17.3 || 1.5 km || multiple || 2002–2021 || 16 Jan 2021 || 134 || align=left | Disc.: NEAT || 
|- id="2002 RX292" bgcolor=#E9E9E9
| 0 ||  || MBA-M || 17.7 || 1.2 km || multiple || 2002–2021 || 17 Jan 2021 || 136 || align=left | Disc.: NEATAlt.: 2011 WZ154 || 
|- id="2002 RY292" bgcolor=#E9E9E9
| 0 ||  || MBA-M || 17.46 || data-sort-value="0.96" | 960 m || multiple || 1996–2021 || 09 May 2021 || 45 || align=left | Disc.: NEAT || 
|- id="2002 RA293" bgcolor=#E9E9E9
| 1 ||  || MBA-M || 18.67 || data-sort-value="0.78" | 780 m || multiple || 2002–2019 || 28 Nov 2019 || 62 || align=left | Disc.: NEATAdded on 22 July 2020 || 
|- id="2002 RB293" bgcolor=#d6d6d6
| – ||  || MBA-O || 18.1 || 1.3 km || single || 17 days || 14 Sep 2002 || 8 || align=left | Disc.: NEAT || 
|- id="2002 RC293" bgcolor=#d6d6d6
| 0 ||  || MBA-O || 16.1 || 3.4 km || multiple || 2002–2020 || 22 Dec 2020 || 141 || align=left | Disc.: NEATAlt.: 2006 DW191 || 
|- id="2002 RE293" bgcolor=#d6d6d6
| 0 ||  || MBA-O || 16.62 || 2.6 km || multiple || 2002–2021 || 06 May 2021 || 115 || align=left | Disc.: NEATAlt.: 2008 VH40 || 
|- id="2002 RF293" bgcolor=#E9E9E9
| 0 ||  || MBA-M || 18.14 || 1.3 km || multiple || 2002–2021 || 28 Oct 2021 || 73 || align=left | Disc.: NEAT || 
|- id="2002 RG293" bgcolor=#d6d6d6
| 0 ||  || MBA-O || 16.2 || 3.2 km || multiple || 2002–2021 || 15 Jan 2021 || 133 || align=left | Disc.: NEATAlt.: 2007 MY18 || 
|- id="2002 RJ293" bgcolor=#E9E9E9
| 0 ||  || MBA-M || 17.5 || 1.8 km || multiple || 2002–2021 || 06 Jan 2021 || 188 || align=left | Disc.: NEATAlt.: 2011 RB3 || 
|- id="2002 RK293" bgcolor=#d6d6d6
| 0 ||  || MBA-O || 16.5 || 2.8 km || multiple || 2002–2019 || 02 Nov 2019 || 44 || align=left | Disc.: NEAT || 
|- id="2002 RL293" bgcolor=#d6d6d6
| 0 ||  || MBA-O || 16.3 || 3.1 km || multiple || 2002–2020 || 07 Dec 2020 || 80 || align=left | Disc.: NEAT || 
|- id="2002 RM293" bgcolor=#fefefe
| 0 ||  || MBA-I || 17.6 || data-sort-value="0.90" | 900 m || multiple || 2002–2020 || 09 Dec 2020 || 99 || align=left | Disc.: NEAT || 
|- id="2002 RO293" bgcolor=#E9E9E9
| 0 ||  || MBA-M || 17.79 || data-sort-value="0.82" | 820 m || multiple || 2002–2021 || 09 Apr 2021 || 37 || align=left | Disc.: NEAT || 
|- id="2002 RP293" bgcolor=#d6d6d6
| 0 ||  || MBA-O || 16.6 || 2.7 km || multiple || 2002–2021 || 18 Jan 2021 || 92 || align=left | Disc.: NEAT || 
|- id="2002 RQ293" bgcolor=#d6d6d6
| 0 ||  || MBA-O || 16.9 || 2.3 km || multiple || 2002–2019 || 30 Nov 2019 || 55 || align=left | Disc.: NEAT || 
|- id="2002 RR293" bgcolor=#E9E9E9
| 0 ||  || MBA-M || 16.74 || 1.3 km || multiple || 2000–2021 || 11 May 2021 || 142 || align=left | Disc.: NEATAlt.: 2010 HZ88, 2011 WM116 || 
|- id="2002 RT293" bgcolor=#E9E9E9
| 0 ||  || MBA-M || 17.2 || 1.5 km || multiple || 2002–2020 || 24 Jan 2020 || 156 || align=left | Disc.: NEAT || 
|- id="2002 RU293" bgcolor=#fefefe
| 0 ||  || MBA-I || 18.6 || data-sort-value="0.57" | 570 m || multiple || 2002–2020 || 15 Dec 2020 || 102 || align=left | Disc.: NEAT || 
|- id="2002 RB294" bgcolor=#d6d6d6
| 0 ||  || MBA-O || 16.6 || 2.7 km || multiple || 2002–2020 || 23 Nov 2020 || 63 || align=left | Disc.: NEATAlt.: 2008 US310 || 
|- id="2002 RC294" bgcolor=#d6d6d6
| 0 ||  || MBA-O || 15.97 || 3.6 km || multiple || 2002–2022 || 09 Jan 2022 || 131 || align=left | Disc.: NEATAlt.: 2014 WH18, 2016 BY65 || 
|- id="2002 RD294" bgcolor=#fefefe
| 0 ||  || HUN || 18.4 || data-sort-value="0.62" | 620 m || multiple || 2002–2020 || 21 Oct 2020 || 189 || align=left | Disc.: NEAT || 
|- id="2002 RE294" bgcolor=#FA8072
| 0 ||  || MCA || 18.76 || data-sort-value="0.53" | 530 m || multiple || 2002–2021 || 30 Jun 2021 || 85 || align=left | Disc.: NEAT || 
|- id="2002 RG294" bgcolor=#fefefe
| 1 ||  || MBA-I || 19.1 || data-sort-value="0.45" | 450 m || multiple || 2002–2020 || 02 Feb 2020 || 35 || align=left | Disc.: NEAT || 
|- id="2002 RJ294" bgcolor=#d6d6d6
| 0 ||  || MBA-O || 16.60 || 2.7 km || multiple || 1999–2021 || 09 May 2021 || 134 || align=left | Disc.: NEAT || 
|- id="2002 RK294" bgcolor=#fefefe
| 0 ||  || MBA-I || 18.47 || data-sort-value="0.60" | 600 m || multiple || 2002–2021 || 09 May 2021 || 104 || align=left | Disc.: NEATAlt.: 2015 OD38 || 
|- id="2002 RL294" bgcolor=#d6d6d6
| 0 ||  || MBA-O || 16.58 || 2.7 km || multiple || 2002–2021 || 14 Apr 2021 || 89 || align=left | Disc.: NEAT || 
|- id="2002 RQ294" bgcolor=#E9E9E9
| 1 ||  || MBA-M || 17.4 || 1.8 km || multiple || 2002–2016 || 30 Nov 2016 || 27 || align=left | Disc.: NEAT || 
|- id="2002 RR294" bgcolor=#d6d6d6
| 0 ||  || MBA-O || 16.5 || 2.8 km || multiple || 2002–2021 || 06 Jan 2021 || 61 || align=left | Disc.: NEAT || 
|- id="2002 RS294" bgcolor=#fefefe
| 1 ||  || MBA-I || 18.0 || data-sort-value="0.75" | 750 m || multiple || 2002–2020 || 19 Jan 2020 || 107 || align=left | Disc.: AMOS || 
|- id="2002 RT294" bgcolor=#fefefe
| 0 ||  || MBA-I || 17.64 || data-sort-value="0.88" | 880 m || multiple || 2001–2021 || 24 Nov 2021 || 183 || align=left | Disc.: AMOS || 
|- id="2002 RU294" bgcolor=#E9E9E9
| 3 ||  || MBA-M || 17.9 || data-sort-value="0.78" | 780 m || multiple || 2002–2020 || 02 Feb 2020 || 48 || align=left | Disc.: AMOS || 
|- id="2002 RV294" bgcolor=#E9E9E9
| 0 ||  || MBA-M || 17.6 || 1.3 km || multiple || 2002–2021 || 18 Jan 2021 || 123 || align=left | Disc.: AMOSAlt.: 2015 VW5 || 
|- id="2002 RW294" bgcolor=#d6d6d6
| 0 ||  || MBA-O || 17.05 || 2.2 km || multiple || 2002–2021 || 10 Apr 2021 || 84 || align=left | Disc.: NEAT || 
|- id="2002 RX294" bgcolor=#fefefe
| 0 ||  || MBA-I || 18.0 || data-sort-value="0.75" | 750 m || multiple || 2002–2020 || 16 Dec 2020 || 101 || align=left | Disc.: AMOSAlt.: 2015 FK141 || 
|- id="2002 RZ294" bgcolor=#E9E9E9
| 1 ||  || MBA-M || 18.1 || data-sort-value="0.71" | 710 m || multiple || 2002–2020 || 05 Jan 2020 || 46 || align=left | Disc.: AMOSAlt.: 2008 CD162 || 
|- id="2002 RA295" bgcolor=#E9E9E9
| 0 ||  || MBA-M || 16.9 || 1.2 km || multiple || 1993–2021 || 24 Jan 2021 || 122 || align=left | Disc.: AMOS || 
|- id="2002 RB295" bgcolor=#E9E9E9
| 1 ||  || MBA-M || 17.5 || data-sort-value="0.94" | 940 m || multiple || 2002–2020 || 05 Feb 2020 || 103 || align=left | Disc.: NEATAlt.: 2006 QP36 || 
|- id="2002 RC295" bgcolor=#d6d6d6
| 0 ||  || MBA-O || 16.34 || 3.0 km || multiple || 1991–2021 || 15 Jan 2021 || 121 || align=left | Disc.: NEAT || 
|- id="2002 RE295" bgcolor=#E9E9E9
| 0 ||  || MBA-M || 16.66 || 1.4 km || multiple || 2002–2022 || 14 Jan 2022 || 194 || align=left | Disc.: NEATAlt.: 2010 GH80 || 
|- id="2002 RF295" bgcolor=#d6d6d6
| 0 ||  || MBA-O || 16.61 || 2.7 km || multiple || 2001–2021 || 30 Nov 2021 || 97 || align=left | Disc.: NEAT || 
|- id="2002 RG295" bgcolor=#d6d6d6
| 0 ||  || MBA-O || 16.75 || 2.5 km || multiple || 2002–2021 || 14 May 2021 || 109 || align=left | Disc.: NEATAlt.: 2012 PE40 || 
|- id="2002 RH295" bgcolor=#d6d6d6
| 0 ||  || MBA-O || 14.70 || 6.4 km || multiple || 2002–2022 || 27 Jan 2022 || 415 || align=left | Disc.: NEATAlt.: 2006 DW67, 2010 CZ5, 2011 AT24 || 
|- id="2002 RJ295" bgcolor=#d6d6d6
| 0 ||  || MBA-O || 16.2 || 3.2 km || multiple || 2002–2021 || 18 Jan 2021 || 87 || align=left | Disc.: NEATAlt.: 2013 TW76 || 
|- id="2002 RK295" bgcolor=#d6d6d6
| 1 ||  || MBA-O || 17.71 || 1.6 km || multiple || 2002–2021 || 09 May 2021 || 54 || align=left | Disc.: NEAT || 
|- id="2002 RL295" bgcolor=#E9E9E9
| 0 ||  || MBA-M || 17.44 || 1.4 km || multiple || 2002–2019 || 24 Dec 2019 || 187 || align=left | Disc.: NEAT || 
|- id="2002 RM295" bgcolor=#E9E9E9
| 0 ||  || MBA-M || 16.56 || 1.4 km || multiple || 2002–2021 || 10 May 2021 || 171 || align=left | Disc.: NEAT || 
|- id="2002 RN295" bgcolor=#E9E9E9
| 2 ||  || MBA-M || 17.6 || 1.3 km || multiple || 2002–2020 || 19 Jan 2020 || 86 || align=left | Disc.: NEAT || 
|- id="2002 RO295" bgcolor=#d6d6d6
| 0 ||  || MBA-O || 16.5 || 2.8 km || multiple || 2002–2021 || 18 Jan 2021 || 112 || align=left | Disc.: NEAT || 
|- id="2002 RP295" bgcolor=#fefefe
| 1 ||  || MBA-I || 17.62 || data-sort-value="0.98" | 880 m || multiple || 2001-2023 || 29 Jan 2023 || 43 || align=left | Disc.: NEAT || 
|- id="2002 RQ295" bgcolor=#d6d6d6
| 0 ||  || MBA-O || 16.5 || 2.8 km || multiple || 2002–2021 || 17 Jan 2021 || 123 || align=left | Disc.: NEATAlt.: 2015 AL7 || 
|- id="2002 RR295" bgcolor=#d6d6d6
| 0 ||  || MBA-O || 16.51 || 2.8 km || multiple || 2002–2021 || 12 May 2021 || 137 || align=left | Disc.: NEATAlt.: 2004 BZ127 || 
|- id="2002 RT295" bgcolor=#E9E9E9
| 0 ||  || MBA-M || 16.5 || 1.5 km || multiple || 2002–2021 || 17 Jan 2021 || 182 || align=left | Disc.: AMOSAlt.: 2006 QU12 || 
|- id="2002 RX295" bgcolor=#d6d6d6
| 0 ||  || MBA-O || 16.18 || 3.2 km || multiple || 2002–2021 || 11 May 2021 || 129 || align=left | Disc.: NEATAlt.: 2015 AZ263, 2016 JA16 || 
|- id="2002 RZ295" bgcolor=#fefefe
| 0 ||  || HUN || 18.02 || data-sort-value="0.74" | 740 m || multiple || 2001–2021 || 30 Oct 2021 || 226 || align=left | Disc.: NEATAlt.: 2012 DL51 || 
|- id="2002 RA296" bgcolor=#FA8072
| 2 ||  || MCA || 18.8 || data-sort-value="0.73" | 730 m || multiple || 2002–2015 || 04 Dec 2015 || 62 || align=left | Disc.: NEATAlt.: 2015 RE35 || 
|- id="2002 RB296" bgcolor=#fefefe
| 0 ||  || HUN || 17.8 || data-sort-value="0.82" | 820 m || multiple || 2001–2020 || 20 Jun 2020 || 175 || align=left | Disc.: NEATAlt.: 2004 FU30, 2009 CM1 || 
|- id="2002 RC296" bgcolor=#d6d6d6
| 0 ||  || MBA-O || 16.7 || 2.5 km || multiple || 2002–2020 || 14 Dec 2020 || 70 || align=left | Disc.: NEATAlt.: 2014 WD490 || 
|- id="2002 RD296" bgcolor=#E9E9E9
| 0 ||  || MBA-M || 16.74 || 3.1 km || multiple || 2002–2021 || 11 May 2021 || 145 || align=left | Disc.: NEATAlt.: 2005 JU17, 2010 JG102, 2010 JE107 || 
|- id="2002 RE296" bgcolor=#d6d6d6
| 0 ||  || MBA-O || 16.55 || 3.5 km || multiple || 1996–2021 || 09 Jul 2021 || 163 || align=left | Disc.: NEATAlt.: 2010 KH112, 2012 TW125, 2013 YE133 || 
|- id="2002 RH296" bgcolor=#fefefe
| 0 ||  || MBA-I || 17.7 || data-sort-value="0.86" | 860 m || multiple || 2002–2021 || 16 Jan 2021 || 159 || align=left | Disc.: AMOSAlt.: 2009 QH45, 2015 FA271 || 
|- id="2002 RJ296" bgcolor=#fefefe
| 1 ||  || MBA-I || 18.5 || data-sort-value="0.59" | 590 m || multiple || 1995–2021 || 03 Jan 2021 || 81 || align=left | Disc.: AMOS || 
|- id="2002 RK296" bgcolor=#FA8072
| 1 ||  || MCA || 18.7 || data-sort-value="0.54" | 540 m || multiple || 2002–2015 || 20 Jun 2015 || 30 || align=left | Disc.: NEAT || 
|- id="2002 RM296" bgcolor=#FA8072
| 0 ||  || MCA || 18.9 || data-sort-value="0.49" | 490 m || multiple || 2002–2018 || 13 Aug 2018 || 45 || align=left | Disc.: NEAT || 
|- id="2002 RO296" bgcolor=#fefefe
| 0 ||  || MBA-I || 17.85 || data-sort-value="0.80" | 800 m || multiple || 2001–2022 || 25 Jan 2022 || 148 || align=left | Disc.: NEATAlt.: 2006 WD20, 2015 AX234 || 
|- id="2002 RP296" bgcolor=#fefefe
| 0 ||  || MBA-I || 17.12 || 1.1 km || multiple || 2002–2021 || 31 Oct 2021 || 197 || align=left | Disc.: NEATAlt.: 2008 AK60 || 
|- id="2002 RQ296" bgcolor=#d6d6d6
| 0 ||  || MBA-O || 16.9 || 2.3 km || multiple || 2002–2018 || 01 Oct 2018 || 58 || align=left | Disc.: AMOS || 
|- id="2002 RS296" bgcolor=#E9E9E9
| 0 ||  || MBA-M || 17.0 || 2.2 km || multiple || 2002–2020 || 17 Dec 2020 || 152 || align=left | Disc.: NEATAlt.: 2002 TB389 || 
|- id="2002 RV296" bgcolor=#d6d6d6
| 0 ||  || MBA-O || 17.3 || 1.9 km || multiple || 2002–2018 || 12 Nov 2018 || 49 || align=left | Disc.: NEAT || 
|- id="2002 RW296" bgcolor=#d6d6d6
| 0 ||  || MBA-O || 16.82 || 2.4 km || multiple || 2002–2021 || 14 Apr 2021 || 101 || align=left | Disc.: NEAT || 
|- id="2002 RX296" bgcolor=#E9E9E9
| 0 ||  || MBA-M || 17.6 || data-sort-value="0.90" | 900 m || multiple || 2001–2021 || 16 Jan 2021 || 68 || align=left | Disc.: AMOSAlt.: 2015 XR267 || 
|- id="2002 RY296" bgcolor=#E9E9E9
| – ||  || MBA-M || 18.2 || data-sort-value="0.68" | 680 m || single || 12 days || 17 Sep 2002 || 12 || align=left | Disc.: NEAT || 
|- id="2002 RZ296" bgcolor=#d6d6d6
| 0 ||  || MBA-O || 15.7 || 3.4 km || multiple || 1991–2021 || 19 Jan 2021 || 202 || align=left | Disc.: AMOSAlt.: 2010 GG78, 2013 SE11 || 
|- id="2002 RB297" bgcolor=#d6d6d6
| 0 ||  || HIL || 15.5 || 4.4 km || multiple || 2002–2019 || 01 Jan 2019 || 97 || align=left | Disc.: NEATAlt.: 2010 NT12, 2011 BT77 || 
|- id="2002 RC297" bgcolor=#E9E9E9
| 1 ||  || MBA-M || 17.6 || 1.3 km || multiple || 1998–2019 || 31 Oct 2019 || 78 || align=left | Disc.: NEAT || 
|- id="2002 RD297" bgcolor=#d6d6d6
| 0 ||  || MBA-O || 16.0 || 3.5 km || multiple || 2002–2021 || 18 Jan 2021 || 153 || align=left | Disc.: NEATAlt.: 2011 GP8, 2012 LP21 || 
|- id="2002 RE297" bgcolor=#fefefe
| 0 ||  || MBA-I || 17.79 || data-sort-value="0.82" | 820 m || multiple || 2002–2021 || 02 Apr 2021 || 111 || align=left | Disc.: NEATAlt.: 2009 WO231 || 
|- id="2002 RF297" bgcolor=#E9E9E9
| 0 ||  || MBA-M || 17.69 || data-sort-value="0.86" | 860 m || multiple || 2002–2021 || 09 May 2021 || 59 || align=left | Disc.: NEAT || 
|- id="2002 RG297" bgcolor=#fefefe
| 0 ||  || MBA-I || 18.73 || data-sort-value="0.53" | 530 m || multiple || 1992–2021 || 15 Apr 2021 || 54 || align=left | Disc.: NEAT || 
|- id="2002 RH297" bgcolor=#d6d6d6
| 0 ||  || MBA-O || 16.7 || 2.5 km || multiple || 2002–2021 || 15 Jan 2021 || 63 || align=left | Disc.: NEAT || 
|- id="2002 RJ297" bgcolor=#fefefe
| 0 ||  || MBA-I || 18.25 || data-sort-value="0.67" | 670 m || multiple || 2002–2022 || 27 Jan 2022 || 41 || align=left | Disc.: AMOS || 
|- id="2002 RK297" bgcolor=#fefefe
| 2 ||  || MBA-I || 18.3 || data-sort-value="0.65" | 650 m || multiple || 1995–2021 || 18 Jan 2021 || 69 || align=left | Disc.: AMOSAlt.: 2009 SM53 || 
|- id="2002 RP297" bgcolor=#fefefe
| 0 ||  || MBA-I || 17.66 || data-sort-value="0.87" | 870 m || multiple || 2002–2021 || 28 Nov 2021 || 187 || align=left | Disc.: NEAT || 
|- id="2002 RQ297" bgcolor=#fefefe
| 0 ||  || MBA-I || 18.34 || data-sort-value="0.64" | 640 m || multiple || 2002–2021 || 13 May 2021 || 101 || align=left | Disc.: SDSS || 
|- id="2002 RS297" bgcolor=#fefefe
| 0 ||  || MBA-I || 17.9 || data-sort-value="0.78" | 780 m || multiple || 2002–2020 || 27 Jan 2020 || 89 || align=left | Disc.: AMOS || 
|- id="2002 RT297" bgcolor=#d6d6d6
| 0 ||  || MBA-O || 16.23 || 3.2 km || multiple || 2002–2021 || 29 Aug 2021 || 71 || align=left | Disc.: SDSS || 
|- id="2002 RU297" bgcolor=#E9E9E9
| 0 ||  || MBA-M || 17.2 || 1.5 km || multiple || 2002–2021 || 07 Jan 2021 || 99 || align=left | Disc.: SDSS || 
|- id="2002 RV297" bgcolor=#E9E9E9
| 0 ||  || MBA-M || 16.9 || 1.8 km || multiple || 2002–2019 || 29 Oct 2019 || 79 || align=left | Disc.: SDSS || 
|- id="2002 RW297" bgcolor=#d6d6d6
| 0 ||  || MBA-O || 15.7 || 4.0 km || multiple || 2002–2021 || 17 Jan 2021 || 183 || align=left | Disc.: NEATAlt.: 2010 FP109, 2016 CV19 || 
|- id="2002 RZ297" bgcolor=#d6d6d6
| 0 ||  || MBA-O || 16.6 || 2.7 km || multiple || 2002–2019 || 28 Nov 2019 || 98 || align=left | Disc.: SDSS || 
|- id="2002 RB298" bgcolor=#fefefe
| 0 ||  || MBA-I || 17.7 || data-sort-value="0.86" | 860 m || multiple || 2002–2021 || 18 Jan 2021 || 101 || align=left | Disc.: NEAT || 
|- id="2002 RC298" bgcolor=#fefefe
| 0 ||  || MBA-I || 18.29 || data-sort-value="0.65" | 650 m || multiple || 2002–2022 || 07 Jan 2022 || 69 || align=left | Disc.: SDSS || 
|- id="2002 RE298" bgcolor=#E9E9E9
| 0 ||  || MBA-M || 17.7 || data-sort-value="0.86" | 860 m || multiple || 2002–2020 || 01 Feb 2020 || 82 || align=left | Disc.: NEAT || 
|- id="2002 RF298" bgcolor=#E9E9E9
| 0 ||  || MBA-M || 17.18 || 2.0 km || multiple || 2002–2022 || 06 Jan 2022 || 99 || align=left | Disc.: SDSS || 
|- id="2002 RH298" bgcolor=#E9E9E9
| 0 ||  || MBA-M || 16.8 || 1.3 km || multiple || 2002–2021 || 16 Jan 2021 || 92 || align=left | Disc.: NEAT || 
|- id="2002 RJ298" bgcolor=#E9E9E9
| 0 ||  || MBA-M || 17.63 || data-sort-value="0.89" | 890 m || multiple || 2002–2021 || 03 May 2021 || 121 || align=left | Disc.: SDSS || 
|- id="2002 RL298" bgcolor=#fefefe
| 1 ||  || MBA-I || 17.9 || data-sort-value="0.78" | 780 m || multiple || 2002–2020 || 22 Apr 2020 || 54 || align=left | Disc.: CINEOS || 
|- id="2002 RM298" bgcolor=#fefefe
| 0 ||  || MBA-I || 18.5 || data-sort-value="0.59" | 590 m || multiple || 2002–2020 || 21 Jul 2020 || 56 || align=left | Disc.: NEAT || 
|- id="2002 RN298" bgcolor=#d6d6d6
| 0 ||  || MBA-O || 16.97 || 2.2 km || multiple || 2002–2021 || 30 May 2021 || 74 || align=left | Disc.: SDSS || 
|- id="2002 RP298" bgcolor=#E9E9E9
| 0 ||  || MBA-M || 17.23 || 2.0 km || multiple || 2002–2021 || 19 Nov 2021 || 84 || align=left | Disc.: SDSS || 
|- id="2002 RQ298" bgcolor=#d6d6d6
| 0 ||  || MBA-O || 17.5 || 1.8 km || multiple || 2002–2020 || 27 Apr 2020 || 56 || align=left | Disc.: SDSS || 
|- id="2002 RR298" bgcolor=#fefefe
| 0 ||  || MBA-I || 18.3 || data-sort-value="0.65" | 650 m || multiple || 1995–2020 || 12 Nov 2020 || 121 || align=left | Disc.: NEAT || 
|- id="2002 RS298" bgcolor=#fefefe
| 0 ||  || MBA-I || 18.0 || data-sort-value="0.75" | 750 m || multiple || 2002–2020 || 15 Feb 2020 || 72 || align=left | Disc.: NEAT || 
|- id="2002 RV298" bgcolor=#E9E9E9
| 0 ||  || MBA-M || 17.49 || data-sort-value="0.94" | 940 m || multiple || 2002–2021 || 01 Apr 2021 || 96 || align=left | Disc.: NEATAlt.: 2019 TZ9 || 
|- id="2002 RW298" bgcolor=#fefefe
| 0 ||  || MBA-I || 18.1 || data-sort-value="0.71" | 710 m || multiple || 2002–2020 || 20 Oct 2020 || 97 || align=left | Disc.: NEAT || 
|- id="2002 RX298" bgcolor=#fefefe
| 0 ||  || MBA-I || 18.3 || data-sort-value="0.65" | 650 m || multiple || 2002–2020 || 10 Dec 2020 || 72 || align=left | Disc.: SDSS || 
|- id="2002 RZ298" bgcolor=#E9E9E9
| 0 ||  || MBA-M || 17.5 || data-sort-value="0.94" | 940 m || multiple || 2002–2020 || 02 Feb 2020 || 55 || align=left | Disc.: LONEOS || 
|- id="2002 RD299" bgcolor=#fefefe
| 1 ||  || MBA-I || 18.0 || data-sort-value="0.75" | 750 m || multiple || 2002–2020 || 16 Dec 2020 || 85 || align=left | Disc.: NEAT || 
|- id="2002 RF299" bgcolor=#E9E9E9
| 0 ||  || MBA-M || 17.1 || 1.6 km || multiple || 2002–2021 || 16 Jan 2021 || 89 || align=left | Disc.: NEAT || 
|- id="2002 RG299" bgcolor=#E9E9E9
| 0 ||  || MBA-M || 17.2 || 1.5 km || multiple || 2001–2020 || 23 Oct 2020 || 102 || align=left | Disc.: SDSS || 
|- id="2002 RH299" bgcolor=#E9E9E9
| 0 ||  || MBA-M || 17.83 || 1.5 km || multiple || 2002–2021 || 07 Nov 2021 || 161 || align=left | Disc.: SDSSAlt.: 2010 ND15, 2016 UL198 || 
|- id="2002 RJ299" bgcolor=#E9E9E9
| 2 ||  || MBA-M || 18.1 || 1.0 km || multiple || 2002–2020 || 24 Jan 2020 || 76 || align=left | Disc.: NEAT || 
|- id="2002 RK299" bgcolor=#E9E9E9
| 0 ||  || MBA-M || 17.37 || 1.9 km || multiple || 2002–2021 || 28 Oct 2021 || 125 || align=left | Disc.: SDSSAlt.: 2010 AQ124, 2010 NP144 || 
|- id="2002 RL299" bgcolor=#d6d6d6
| 0 ||  || MBA-O || 16.6 || 2.7 km || multiple || 2002–2021 || 09 Jan 2021 || 72 || align=left | Disc.: SDSS || 
|- id="2002 RN299" bgcolor=#fefefe
| 0 ||  || MBA-I || 18.4 || data-sort-value="0.62" | 620 m || multiple || 2002–2019 || 28 Nov 2019 || 52 || align=left | Disc.: SDSS || 
|- id="2002 RP299" bgcolor=#d6d6d6
| 0 ||  || MBA-O || 17.25 || 2.0 km || multiple || 2002–2021 || 04 Apr 2021 || 86 || align=left | Disc.: SDSS || 
|- id="2002 RQ299" bgcolor=#d6d6d6
| 0 ||  || MBA-O || 17.0 || 2.2 km || multiple || 2002–2019 || 07 Sep 2019 || 48 || align=left | Disc.: SDSS || 
|- id="2002 RR299" bgcolor=#d6d6d6
| 0 ||  || MBA-O || 16.6 || 2.7 km || multiple || 2002–2020 || 24 Dec 2020 || 58 || align=left | Disc.: NEAT || 
|- id="2002 RS299" bgcolor=#E9E9E9
| 0 ||  || MBA-M || 18.0 || 1.1 km || multiple || 2002–2019 || 03 Oct 2019 || 43 || align=left | Disc.: SDSS || 
|- id="2002 RT299" bgcolor=#E9E9E9
| 0 ||  || MBA-M || 17.6 || 1.3 km || multiple || 2002–2020 || 22 Dec 2020 || 100 || align=left | Disc.: NEAT || 
|- id="2002 RU299" bgcolor=#fefefe
| 0 ||  || MBA-I || 18.4 || data-sort-value="0.62" | 620 m || multiple || 2002–2021 || 15 Apr 2021 || 58 || align=left | Disc.: SDSSAlt.: 2009 VX57 || 
|- id="2002 RV299" bgcolor=#d6d6d6
| 0 ||  || MBA-O || 16.36 || 3.0 km || multiple || 2002–2019 || 02 Dec 2019 || 43 || align=left | Disc.: NEAT || 
|- id="2002 RW299" bgcolor=#fefefe
| 1 ||  || MBA-I || 18.8 || data-sort-value="0.52" | 520 m || multiple || 2002–2019 || 27 May 2019 || 49 || align=left | Disc.: SDSS || 
|- id="2002 RY299" bgcolor=#d6d6d6
| 0 ||  || MBA-O || 16.8 || 2.4 km || multiple || 2002–2019 || 24 Oct 2019 || 41 || align=left | Disc.: SDSS || 
|- id="2002 RZ299" bgcolor=#d6d6d6
| 0 ||  || MBA-O || 17.2 || 2.0 km || multiple || 2002–2020 || 22 Apr 2020 || 52 || align=left | Disc.: SDSS || 
|- id="2002 RA300" bgcolor=#fefefe
| 0 ||  || MBA-I || 18.6 || data-sort-value="0.57" | 570 m || multiple || 2002–2019 || 22 Jun 2019 || 33 || align=left | Disc.: SDSS || 
|- id="2002 RB300" bgcolor=#d6d6d6
| 2 ||  || MBA-O || 17.5 || 1.8 km || multiple || 2002–2019 || 26 Feb 2019 || 38 || align=left | Disc.: SDSS || 
|- id="2002 RC300" bgcolor=#fefefe
| 1 ||  || MBA-I || 18.9 || data-sort-value="0.49" | 490 m || multiple || 2002–2019 || 28 Nov 2019 || 71 || align=left | Disc.: NEATAlt.: 2010 DA101 || 
|- id="2002 RD300" bgcolor=#d6d6d6
| 0 ||  || MBA-O || 16.93 || 2.3 km || multiple || 2002–2021 || 14 May 2021 || 50 || align=left | Disc.: SDSS || 
|- id="2002 RG300" bgcolor=#d6d6d6
| 0 ||  || MBA-O || 16.7 || 2.5 km || multiple || 2002–2018 || 08 Nov 2018 || 28 || align=left | Disc.: SDSS || 
|- id="2002 RH300" bgcolor=#FA8072
| 1 ||  || MCA || 18.5 || data-sort-value="0.59" | 590 m || multiple || 2002–2019 || 30 Nov 2019 || 40 || align=left | Disc.: NEAT || 
|- id="2002 RJ300" bgcolor=#E9E9E9
| 0 ||  || MBA-M || 17.1 || 1.6 km || multiple || 2002–2019 || 04 Oct 2019 || 108 || align=left | Disc.: NEAT || 
|- id="2002 RK300" bgcolor=#E9E9E9
| 0 ||  || MBA-M || 17.3 || 1.9 km || multiple || 2002–2020 || 20 Oct 2020 || 102 || align=left | Disc.: SDSS || 
|- id="2002 RL300" bgcolor=#fefefe
| 1 ||  || MBA-I || 18.5 || data-sort-value="0.59" | 590 m || multiple || 2002–2019 || 04 Oct 2019 || 51 || align=left | Disc.: SDSS || 
|- id="2002 RM300" bgcolor=#E9E9E9
| 1 ||  || MBA-M || 17.5 || data-sort-value="0.94" | 940 m || multiple || 2002–2020 || 04 Jan 2020 || 57 || align=left | Disc.: LONEOS || 
|- id="2002 RN300" bgcolor=#fefefe
| 0 ||  || MBA-I || 17.9 || data-sort-value="0.78" | 780 m || multiple || 2002–2020 || 16 Nov 2020 || 108 || align=left | Disc.: NEAT || 
|- id="2002 RO300" bgcolor=#E9E9E9
| 0 ||  || MBA-M || 17.9 || 1.1 km || multiple || 2002–2020 || 18 Nov 2020 || 41 || align=left | Disc.: SDSS || 
|- id="2002 RP300" bgcolor=#fefefe
| 0 ||  || MBA-I || 18.2 || data-sort-value="0.68" | 680 m || multiple || 1995–2021 || 04 Jan 2021 || 67 || align=left | Disc.: NEAT || 
|- id="2002 RR300" bgcolor=#E9E9E9
| 0 ||  || MBA-M || 17.3 || 1.5 km || multiple || 2002–2021 || 06 Jan 2021 || 110 || align=left | Disc.: NEAT || 
|- id="2002 RS300" bgcolor=#E9E9E9
| 0 ||  || MBA-M || 17.11 || 1.1 km || multiple || 2002–2021 || 10 Apr 2021 || 44 || align=left | Disc.: NEAT || 
|- id="2002 RT300" bgcolor=#fefefe
| 1 ||  || MBA-I || 18.3 || data-sort-value="0.65" | 650 m || multiple || 2002–2019 || 24 Aug 2019 || 40 || align=left | Disc.: SDSS || 
|- id="2002 RU300" bgcolor=#fefefe
| 0 ||  || MBA-I || 18.9 || data-sort-value="0.49" | 490 m || multiple || 1995–2020 || 23 Nov 2020 || 50 || align=left | Disc.: NEAT || 
|- id="2002 RV300" bgcolor=#d6d6d6
| 0 ||  || MBA-O || 16.6 || 2.7 km || multiple || 2002–2020 || 09 Dec 2020 || 72 || align=left | Disc.: SDSS || 
|- id="2002 RW300" bgcolor=#d6d6d6
| 0 ||  || MBA-O || 16.86 || 2.4 km || multiple || 2002–2021 || 07 Apr 2021 || 103 || align=left | Disc.: SDSS || 
|- id="2002 RX300" bgcolor=#E9E9E9
| 0 ||  || MBA-M || 17.73 || data-sort-value="0.85" | 850 m || multiple || 2002–2021 || 14 Apr 2021 || 60 || align=left | Disc.: NEAT || 
|- id="2002 RY300" bgcolor=#E9E9E9
| 0 ||  || MBA-M || 17.70 || data-sort-value="0.86" | 860 m || multiple || 2002–2021 || 08 May 2021 || 62 || align=left | Disc.: SDSS || 
|- id="2002 RZ300" bgcolor=#d6d6d6
| 0 ||  || MBA-O || 16.8 || 2.4 km || multiple || 2002–2019 || 25 Sep 2019 || 42 || align=left | Disc.: SDSS || 
|- id="2002 RA301" bgcolor=#E9E9E9
| 2 ||  || MBA-M || 17.1 || 1.1 km || multiple || 2002–2020 || 20 Jan 2020 || 44 || align=left | Disc.: SDSS || 
|- id="2002 RB301" bgcolor=#d6d6d6
| 0 ||  || MBA-O || 16.68 || 2.6 km || multiple || 2002–2021 || 08 Apr 2021 || 61 || align=left | Disc.: SDSSAlt.: 2010 JK203 || 
|- id="2002 RC301" bgcolor=#E9E9E9
| 0 ||  || MBA-M || 17.87 || data-sort-value="0.79" | 790 m || multiple || 2002–2021 || 01 May 2021 || 47 || align=left | Disc.: NEAT || 
|- id="2002 RD301" bgcolor=#E9E9E9
| 0 ||  || MBA-M || 17.36 || 1.0 km || multiple || 2002–2021 || 09 May 2021 || 156 || align=left | Disc.: NEAT || 
|- id="2002 RE301" bgcolor=#fefefe
| 0 ||  || MBA-I || 18.1 || data-sort-value="0.71" | 710 m || multiple || 2002–2020 || 10 Dec 2020 || 91 || align=left | Disc.: NEAT || 
|- id="2002 RG301" bgcolor=#d6d6d6
| 1 ||  || MBA-O || 16.2 || 3.2 km || multiple || 2002–2018 || 05 Oct 2018 || 52 || align=left | Disc.: NEAT || 
|- id="2002 RH301" bgcolor=#d6d6d6
| 0 ||  || MBA-O || 16.76 || 2.5 km || multiple || 2002–2021 || 07 Apr 2021 || 53 || align=left | Disc.: SDSSAlt.: 2010 JJ99 || 
|- id="2002 RK301" bgcolor=#fefefe
| 0 ||  || MBA-I || 18.7 || data-sort-value="0.54" | 540 m || multiple || 2002–2020 || 17 Oct 2020 || 83 || align=left | Disc.: SDSS || 
|- id="2002 RL301" bgcolor=#d6d6d6
| 1 ||  || MBA-O || 17.5 || 1.8 km || multiple || 2002–2020 || 24 Jan 2020 || 40 || align=left | Disc.: NEAT || 
|- id="2002 RM301" bgcolor=#E9E9E9
| 2 ||  || MBA-M || 17.9 || 1.5 km || multiple || 2002–2020 || 05 Nov 2020 || 56 || align=left | Disc.: NEAT || 
|- id="2002 RN301" bgcolor=#fefefe
| 0 ||  || MBA-I || 18.4 || data-sort-value="0.62" | 620 m || multiple || 2002–2020 || 06 Dec 2020 || 124 || align=left | Disc.: NEAT || 
|- id="2002 RO301" bgcolor=#E9E9E9
| 2 ||  || MBA-M || 19.0 || data-sort-value="0.47" | 470 m || multiple || 2002–2018 || 05 Aug 2018 || 29 || align=left | Disc.: SDSS || 
|- id="2002 RQ301" bgcolor=#d6d6d6
| 0 ||  || MBA-O || 17.7 || 1.6 km || multiple || 2002–2018 || 05 Oct 2018 || 36 || align=left | Disc.: NEATAdded on 22 July 2020 || 
|- id="2002 RR301" bgcolor=#E9E9E9
| 0 ||  || MBA-M || 16.7 || 1.9 km || multiple || 2002–2021 || 14 Jan 2021 || 110 || align=left | Disc.: NEATAdded on 19 October 2020 || 
|}
back to top

References 
 

Lists of unnumbered minor planets